= Libertas Schulze-Boysen =

German aristocrat and resistance fighter (1913–1942)

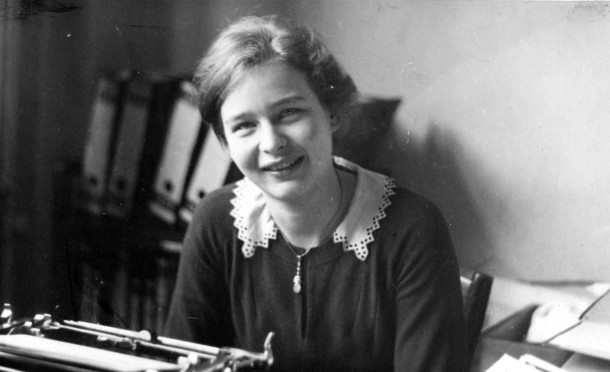
- Schulze-Boysen in 1933
- Born: Libertas Viktoria Haas-Heye; 20 November 1913; Paris, France
- Died: 22 December 1942 (aged 29); Plötzensee Prison, Berlin, Nazi Germany
- Cause of death: Execution by guillotine
- Occupation: Press officer
- Movement: Member of the Red Orchestra ("Rote Kapelle")
- Spouse: Harro Schulze-Boysen

Libertas Viktoria "Libs" Schulze-Boysen (née Haas-Heye; 20 November 1913 – 22 December 1942) was a German noblewoman and resistance fighter against the Nazis. From the early 1930s to 1940, she attempted to build a literary career, first as a press officer and later as a writer and journalist. Initially sympathetic to the Nazis, she changed her mind after meeting and marrying Luftwaffe officer Harro Schulze-Boysen. As an aristocrat, Schulze-Boysen had contact with many different people in different strata of German society. Starting in 1935, she utilized her position to recruit left-leaning Germans into discussion groups which she hosted at her and Harro's apartment, where they sought to influence their guests. Through these discussions, resistance to the Nazi regime grew, and by 1936, she and Harro began to actively resist the Nazis. During the early 1940s, whilst working as a censor for the German Documentary Film Institute, Schulze-Boysen began to document atrocities committed by the Nazis from photographs of war crimes forwarded by soldiers of the Sonderbehandlungen task force to the Film Institute.

By 1940, the couple came into contact with other Berlin-based anti-fascist resistance groups and collaborated with them. The most important of these was run by Arvid Harnack. From April 1941, their underground resistance group became an espionage network that supplied military and economic intelligence to the Soviet Union. That organisation became known as the Red Orchestra ("Rote Kapelle") by the Abwehr. Schulze-Boysen was fully aware of her husband's espionage activities and became one of his most active agents, working as a courier, a writer of seditious pamphlets and a recruiter for the group. When Harro was not present she deputised as the leader of the group. When her husband was arrested in August 1942 by the Gestapo, she made a valiant attempt to destroy evidence of their work and warn other members of the group, but it was to no avail. Schulze-Boysen was arrested in September 1942, a month after her husband Harro, and both were executed on the same day in Plötzensee Prison.

== Life ==
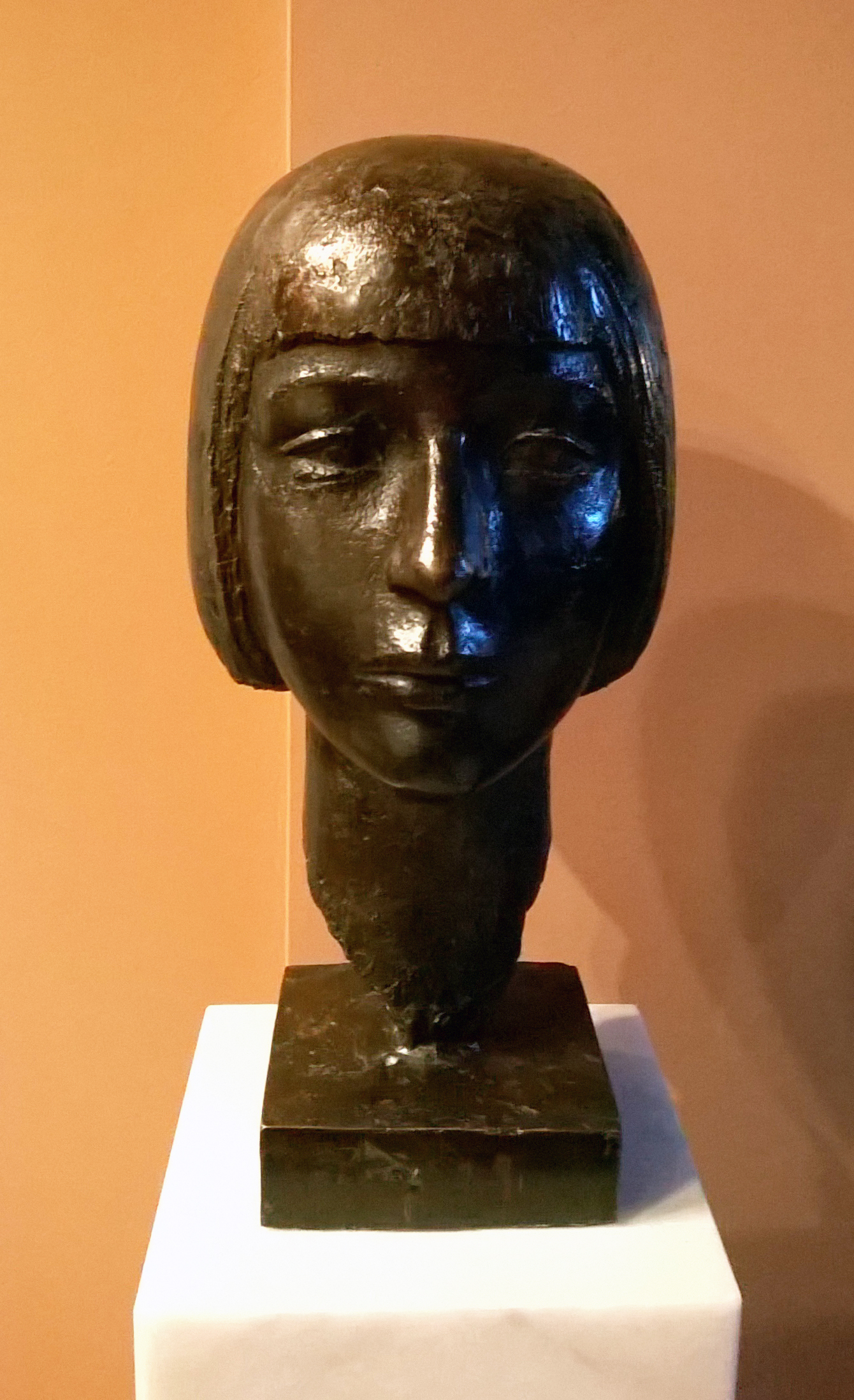
Bust of Libertas at Castle Liebenberg

Schulze-Boysen was born in Paris, the youngest of three children. Her father was the Heidelberg-born Otto Ludwig Haas-Heye (1879–1959), couturier to the aristocracy, and her mother was a noted pianist, Countess Viktoria Ada Astrid Agnes zu Eulenburg (1886–1967). Libertas's parents married in Liebenberg Castle on 13 May 1909 and lived for a time in London and Paris. They were Protestants who believed in providing a religious foundation for their children. Despite her upbringing, Libertas never became overtly religious, although many of her early poems and later letters show Christian roots. Her sister was Countess Ottora Maria Douglas-Reimer (1910–2001), who married Count Carl Douglas (1908–1961), a Swedish diplomat. The couple had four children: Count Gustav Archibald Sigvart Douglas (1938–2023), a stockbroker, Princess Elisabeth Christina Douglas (b. 1940), Rosita Spencer-Churchill, Duchess of Marlborough (b. 1943), an artist, and their youngest son, Carl Philipp Morton, (1945- ) a civil engineer. Libertas's older brother, Johannes Haas-Heye (1912 - 2008), was a journalist and diplomat.

Her mother was known as "Thora"—spelled "Tora"—and came from an old Prussian noble family. She was the youngest of the eight children of the Prussian diplomat and composer Prince Philipp zu Eulenburg and his Swedish wife, Countess Augusta Constantia Ulrike Charlotte Sandels. Philipp zu Eulenburg was a close friend of Kaiser William II, German Emperor. Eulenburg and William II were allegedly lovers. This allegation was published as a series of articles by influential journalist Maximilian Harden in the Berlin newspapers between 1907 and 1909. It ran so long that it became known as the Eulenburg affair.

In 1921, when Libertas was eight years old, her parents divorced (unusual at the time) and her grandfather died. Libertas spent part of her childhood at Eulenburg's country estate, Liebenberg Castle (near Berlin). She was taught initially by a governess.

In 1922, she began attending a school in Berlin while living with her father, who headed the fashion department of the Kunstgewerbemuseum. Later, a co-worker of her father (artist Valerie Wolffenstein) supervised her during a summer in Switzerland in 1924, where Libertas learned to draw. Between 1926 and 1932, Schulze-Boysen was sent to be educated at boarding schools in Paris, London and Switzerland.

== Education ==
In 1932, Schulze-Boysen completed her Abitur at a girls' finishing school in Zurich, followed by a 9-month stay in Ireland and the United Kingdom. After returning in January 1933, Schulze-Boysen attended a Nazi torchlight procession that marched past the Reich Chancellery. Though not totally understanding the new and powerful German Youth Movement, she was impressed enough with them to join the Nazi Party with member number 1 551 344, in March 1933, and at the same time the League of German Girls (German: Bund Deutscher Mädel).

== Career ==
=== As a press officer ===
In May of the same year, Schulze-Boysen moved to Berlin after being hired by the motion picture company Metro-Goldwyn-Mayer (MGM) as a press officer. The position consisted of writing reviews to inform the media and public about new cinematic releases. During the spring of 1933, the film studio had sacked all its Jewish employees, leaving it short-staffed and making openings for non-Jewish workers. Initially, Libertas worked on press copy for the American films Sons of the Desert and Dancing Lady, both of which were immediate successes. In May 1933, when the studio started to feel the effects of Nazi censorship, it was forced to drop Herman Mankiewicz's screenplay The Mad Dog of Europe, a film meant to illuminate the worsening treatment of Jews in Germany at that time. Mankiewicz would later go on to write the screenplay for Citizen Kane.

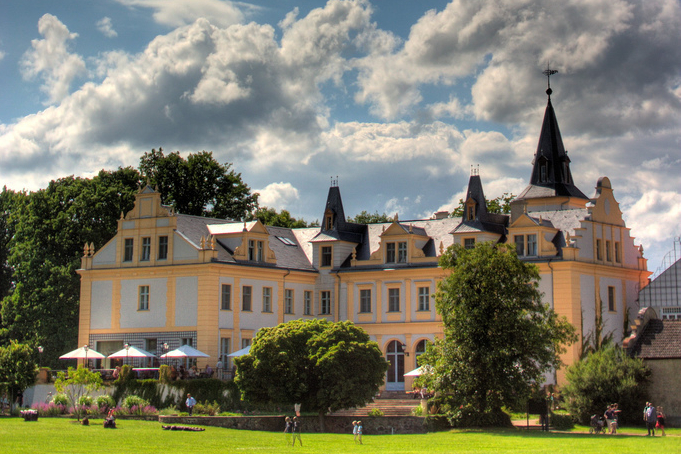
Liebenberg Castle

In April 1934, Libertas met Harro Schulze-Boysen while they were both sailing on the Wannsee. Harro Schulze-Boysen had been the publisher of the left-liberal magazine Der Gegner (English: "The Opponent") between 1932 and 1933. It was closed down when he was arrested by the Sturmabteilung in April 1933. He was badly beaten and lost half his ear, and was only released due to the influence of his mother. Besides the mutilation of his ear, the attack left Harro with damaged kidneys. His Jewish friend Henry Erlanger, who was arrested at the same time, did not survive the beating.

Harro was in the habit of bringing his work friends from Der Gegner together with his other friends and colleagues for social evenings in his apartment, during which they discussed philosophical and political questions of the day. To protect themselves from persecution, the couple surrounded themselves with a group of politically incorruptible friends who were left-leaning anti-fascists, among them artists, pacifists and communists.

In October 1934, the couple moved in together to an apartment in Hohenzollerndamm, in the Wilmersdorf district of Berlin. On 15 January 1935, Schulze-Boysen left to join the Reich Labour Service for female youth (Freiwilligen Arbeitsdienst für die weibliche Jugend) for six months' voluntary work near Glindow, close to Potsdam. On 18 July 1935, she completed her six months of voluntary service, she returned to work at MGM. Her lack of enthusiasm for her voluntary service was such that she decided to write a book that was brutally honest, that described the daily fight for assertion, the status of women in the community and the fight for ideals. She submitted the manuscript to the writer Ernst von Salomon, a family friend who worked at the Rowohlt publishing house for review. Salomon believed it was good enough to publish, but had doubts as to whether the Reich Labour Service would allow it. Rowohlt wanted to publish it for precisely for that reason. Libertas intended to submit the manuscript for review to the Reich Labour Service, but whether that actually happened, is unknown. Salomon heard nothing further on that point. The nature of her work at MGM—the tedious cycle of film promotion and censor work—made Libertas restless.

Starting in July 1935, Schulze-Boysen began working on Harro's magazine Wille zum Reich ("Will to Empire") as an editor and translator. The magazine dealt with cultural and political issues, but with the goal of undermining the Nazi movement with the magazine's own themes. In August 1935, Harro was given permission by the Ministry of Aviation (Luftfahrtministerium) to attend a series of lectures on the League of Nations in Geneva, and Libertas accompanied him. On the way home, the couple stopped at the Château de Muzot to visit the last home of the Bohemian-Austrian poet and novelist Rainer Maria Rilke as well as visit his tomb.

In the spring of 1936, Schulze-Boysen applied to leave the Nazi party by submitting a resignation request to the Reichsleitung der NSDAP in Munich.

== Marriage ==
During Easter in 1936, the couple were engaged and lived together for a year before getting married on 26 July 1936. The wedding took place in the chapel of Liebenberg Castle under a painting of Guido Reni, with Hermann Göring giving away the bride. For their honeymoon, the couple visited Stockholm in Sweden, where Harro was introduced to Libertas's Swedish relatives, her sister Ottora and her sister's husband Count Douglas. Harro was on duty during the short honeymoon that the couple took between 27 July and 9 August 1936. He had arranged a language study trip from his employer and he had submitted a confidential report upon his return, that detailed the description and the constitution of the crafts in the bays. At the time, Libertas was unprepared for the fact that Harro spent more time looking at the military installations and the ships in the harbour than at her. Schulze-Boysen considered herself a libertine and the couple had an open marriage.

== First mission ==
In August 1936, the journalist Evan James, an English friend of Libertas's from her 1933 stay in England, lodged with the couple to report on the 1936 Summer Olympics. At the time, Harro wanted to give James the details on prisoner numbers from the Spanish Civil War, compiled from situation reports his office received, so he could get them published by the BBC. However James refused, stating the source would be too easy to identify. Instead, Libertas translated the bombastic words from the first page of Mein Kampf, to warn him, to show him, that there would be war. However, James did not want to hear. Instead the couple showed James the anti-Jewish notices in the shops but what is so obvious to them, that the Nazi consolidation of power will lead to war, was not so obvious to James. At the time Harro was dumbfounded at James' attitude but gradually realised that his position in the Air Ministry could give him access to valuable information but to access the most valuable and sensitive information, he would need to rise in the ranks. They decided to invite Göring to the Liebenberg estate, to hunt deer, on 6 September 1936. Göring's country estate of Carinhall was next to Liebenberg Castle. In essence it was a charm offensive, led by Libertas, to get Harro noticed. Libertas was successful as Göring made an enquiry to Hans-Jürgen Stumpff, who reported the Harro Schulze-Boysen was considered unreliable due to his political involvements before 1933. Göring replied that the "...old things should be left alone" and that Harro should be sent on a pilots course, enabling his career advancement.

On 1 October 1936, the couple moved into an apartment at 2 Waitzstraße in Charlottenburg. At the same time, their marriage ran into trouble. Due to pain in Harro's kidneys and the Swastika carved into his leg when he was arrested, he found lovemaking difficult. After sex, his urine would turn red. Libertas realised the marriage was in trouble and influenced by the views of her husband, returned her Nazi membership booklet.

== Picnic meetings ==
During 1937, they held their first public picnic evenings and held further meetings every other week on Thursday nights. Their first picnic evening of the year was held on 21 January 1937. Among the 30 odd guests were Gisela von Pöllnitz and a doctor, Elfriede Paul who was the girlfriend of Walter Küchenmeister who had been invited on the advice of Elisabeth Schumacher—wife of Kurt Schumacher who also attended. Among the other guests were Heinrich Karbe, a journalist for the Essen National Newspaper, the actor Werner Dissel and the Rowohlt editor Ernst von Salomon.

== Resistance ==
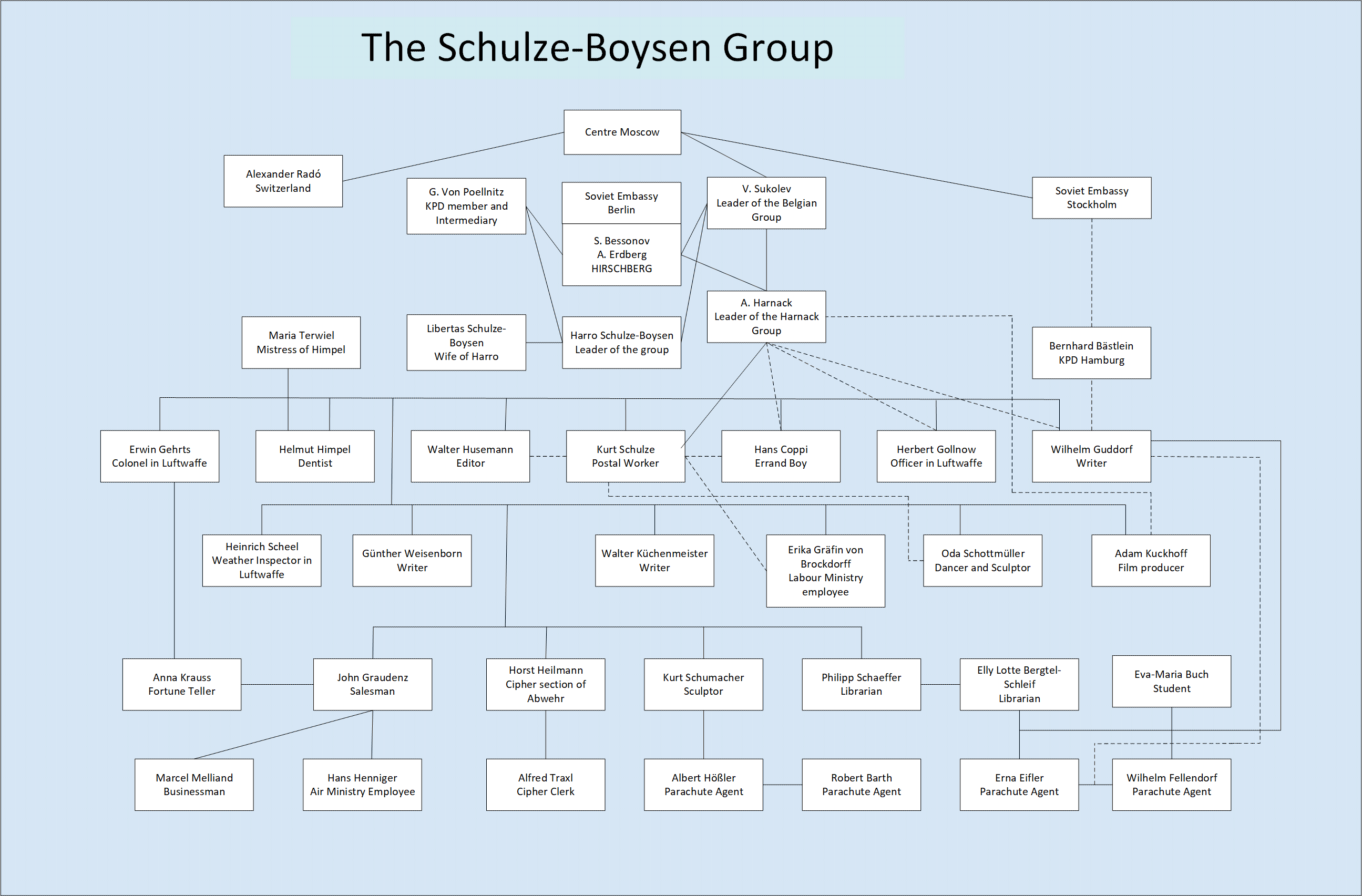
The Schulze-Boysen group in Germany

The Spanish Civil War galvanised the inner circle of the group in their discussions. Kurt Schumacher demanded that action should be taken and a plan, that took advantage of Harro's position at the ministry was formed. In February 1937, Harro compiled a short information document about a sabotage enterprise planned in Barcelona by the German Wehrmacht. The information was from "Special Staff W", an organisation established by Luftwaffe general Helmuth Wilberg to study and analyse the tactical lessons learned by the Legion Kondor during the Spanish Civil War. The unit also directed the German relief operations that consisted of volunteers, weapons and ammunition for General Francisco Franco's FET y de las JONS. The information that Schulze-Boysen collected included details about German transports, deployment of units and companies involved in the German defence. The group around Schulze-Boysen did not know how to deliver the information, but discovered that Schulze-Boysen's cousin, Gisela von Pöllnitz, was planning to visit the Exposition Internationale des Arts et Techniques dans la Vie Moderne that was held in Paris from 25 May to 25 November 1937. In November, Pöllnitz fulfilled her mission and placed the letter in the mailbox of the Soviet Embassy on the Bois de Boulogne. Unfortunately the Gestapo were watching the location and she was arrested. The couple, fearing instant retribution from the Gestapo, decided to leave Berlin for several weeks. On 27 September 1937, Harro left for a treatment for kidney stones at a sanatorium in Bad Wildungen, while Libertas arranged a sea trip via a friend, on the cargo ship SS Ilona Siemers (1923) that left from the Hamburg port of St. Pauli, transporting coal to the Black Sea. During the journey, she filled her journal on stories of her travels. She returned on Christmas Day 1937.

In late 1937, Schulze-Boysen met the playwright Günther Weisenborn who had been friends with Harro since 1932. in what was their first illegal meeting that was attended by Kuchenmeister and Schumacher. On 12 January 1938, Weisenborn was introduced to Libertas. In February 1938, the Schulze-Boysens learnt that von Pöllnitz had been arrested the month before. Their apartment at 2 Waitzstraße was searched by the Gestapo but nothing was found as the couple had spent several days feverishly clearing the place of any evidence of wrongdoing. After Harro was cleared by the Air Ministry, their plans to flee to Amsterdam, where Johannes Haas-Heye was stationed, were abandoned. As the year progressed Libertas and Weisenborn relationship blossomed and eventually consummated in an open affair. In the same month, they collaborated in writing a play Die guten Feinde (The Good Enemies) about the German physician Robert Koch and his competition with Max Pettenkofer and their search for the causes of tuberculosis .

In July 1938, von Pöllnitz was released from prison and was seriously ill with a tuberculosis infection. Libertas and Elfriede Paul began caring for her cousin, ensuring she was able to attend a sanatorium first in Sommerfeld in the Brandenberg sands and then later in Switzerland. The Gestapo visited and searched their apartment as they were associates of von Pöllnitz. The visits along with von Pöllnitz's illness led Schulze-Boysen to suffer from a general malaise that caused her to flee to Zurich, a city she felt safe in. On 6 August 1938, she was introduced to the author Thomas Mann and spoke about her difficulties. Mann recorded the meeting in his diary. When Libertas returned in August, she worked with Weisenborn to arrange the premier of the play at a theatre in Bremen in November 1938, that was delated but finally held on 1 March 1939 at the Theater Bremen. At the same time, Schulze-Boysen had signed a contract with Deutschlandsender for a production of a radio play that was broadcast on 3 March 1939. On 9 November, the couple went on a 2-day holiday together to Venice Italy, the first time the couple had been together for months, that was due to the demanding need for overtime at the Air Ministry. When the couple returned they witnessed Kristallnacht. At the end of 1938, looking to determine her fortune, Schulze-Boysen became a client of Anna Krauss, a well-known clairvoyant and fortune-teller. Through Krauss, Libertas met Toni Graudenz, a neighbour and they became friends. Her husband was John Graudenz. Schulze-Boysen introduced both Krauss and Graudenz into the resistance group.

In April 1939, the couple moved into their new apartment at Altenburger Allee 19 in Charlottenburg, now the Westend. In the summer of 1939, Schulze-Boysen visited the town of Nidden on the Curonian Spit. While there, she photographed a ship laden with Jewish passengers desperate to reach Latvia. She was immediately arrested, but refused to say anything and was permitted to leave.

=== Schulze-Boysen/Harnack group ===
In September 1939, the Schulze-Boysens met the writer and playwright Adam Kuckhoff and his wife, the socialist Greta Kuckhoff at a dinner party hosted by the film producer Herbert Engelsing and his wife Ingeborg at their house in Bettinstraße in Grunewald. The free exchange of ideas and opinion was expected. Herbert Engelsing was planning to produce a film on Adam's book, "Der Deutsche von Bayencourt (The German from Bayencourt) that had been published in 1937 and became prominent. The party at the Engelsings, who were close friends of the Schulze-Boysens, was the ideal way to gauge the political stance of the Kuckhoff's. The Kuckhoffs were impressed by the Schulze-Boysens and shared the same political views. Libertas and Greta Kuckhoff became close friends. In 1939, Kuckhoff's decided that their close friends, the literary historian, translator Mildred and Marxist economist Arvid Harnack should be introduced to the Schulze-Boysens. Greta decided that it would be the women who should meet first and in late 1939, brought Mildred and Libertas together while on holiday in Saxony. The Harnak's also held group meetings with a preplanned agenda, where they debated the political and economic perspectives of the time but were considered rather austere compared to Libertas and Schulze-Boysen's fun filled nights of music and dancing.The initial meeting of the women gave rise to a licentious image of the group that persisted for decades after the war, based primarily on Gestapo and Abwehr reports. In his 1967 book, L'orchestre rouge, Gilles Perrault states that Mildred and Libertas were lesbians, quoted from an unnamed source. However, industrialist Hugo Buschmann, who was an informant and couples close friend, stated that the group lived dangerously, but there was no evidence for Perrault's conclusion Certainly Libertas and Mildred were good friends. Other friends who joined their parties and who became staunch anti-Nazis, included the actor Werner Dissel who they met in 1935 as well as Albrecht Haushofer, Kurt Schumacher and his wife Elisabeth Schumacher, Elfriede Paul, Walter Küchenmeister, the writer Günther Weisenborn, the dancer and sculptor Oda Schottmüller as well as the actor Marta Husemann and her husband, Walter Husemann who was an editor.

In the same month, Schulze-Boysen was informed that her cousin, Gisela von Pöllnitz, had died on 14 September 1939 in a Swiss sanatorium. In the following month, Harro fell ill with Kidney stone disease. The couple spent their Christmas in 1939 apart. The stress of the war, combined with Harro's illness, the start of rationing and the double life they led, lead to what Shulze-Boysen considered the most desolate period in her life.

At the beginning of 1940, the blackout led to the group meeting less often due to the difficulty of walking home in the darkness. Schulze-Boysen arranged to drive their friends home for her apartment, although it involved a considerable risk to herself of being followed. In early 1940, the group was joined by Heinrich Scheel along with Hans and Ina Lautenschläger. Elfriede Paul stated that in early 1940, they discussed the opening of concentration camps in Poland and the military supply organisation known as Organisation Todt. In the spring of 1940, Harro began to study foreign policy at the newly opened Institute of International Studies, part of the Deutsche Hochschule für Politik of the Humboldt University of Berlin for a doctorate, in an attempt to attain the position of Regierungsrat or government councillor.

== Writer and journalist ==
From July 1940 to 13 November 1941, Libertas wrote film reviews for the culture section of the National-Zeitung. The task was difficult as she could not write freely or criticize, as the paper was censored by Joseph Goebbels' propaganda ministry. Beginning in May 1939, on a weekly basis each editor received a copy of the Zeitschriften-Dienst, a confidential newsletter from the ministry that described various directives as to what could be published and the particular theme the Nazi Party wanted to see in use. Libs decided to cooperate in order to express herself and maintain influence. To bypass the censors, she varied her tone, for films she liked, she would often write extravagantly, or in the form of a love letter. In other films that did not find favour, she would write in a strict and formal manner. Originally a temporary position, it became permanent in the summer of 1941, but she became unsettled and decided to leave to try to achieve a film career. Her last article Resurrection the mask in art dance introduced the dancer Oda Schottmüller, to the general public and her successor as film critic was Adam Kuckhoff. Both were her and Harro's friends and both resisted the Nazis.

== Espionage ==
In October 1940, Greta and Libertas finanlly managed to convince Harro Schulze-Boysen to meet with Arvid Harnack. A meeting was held in Adam's and Greta Kuckhoff apartment at Wilhelmshöher Allee 19 in Friedenau. At the meeting of the new combined political faction, Schulze-Boysen, Harnack and Kuckhoff discussed the current situation openly and what they could do to further resist. Harnack told the group that he was introduced to Soviet agent Alexander Korotkov who used the alias Alexander Erdberg and had already told Erdberg on 26 September 1940, that Germany was in the planning stages of an invasion of the Soviet Union. By the end of that first meeting, both Schulze-Boysen and Kuckhoff had agreed to be informants to Harnack. From that point forward, their combined undercover political faction, developed from a resistance organisation into an espionage network, from a small cadre of close friends, that began to collaborate with Soviet intelligence.

In December 1940, Harro was put on a war footing in preparation for the invasion of the Soviet Union, moving to a barracks in a forest in Potsdam. At the beginning of 1941 (sources vary) Harro had begun an affair with Stella Mahlberg, a stage actress. Harro informed Libertas of the affair. As they had an open marriage they promised when they married not to deceive each other. In January 1941, Schulze-Boysen attended the wedding of Günther and Joy Weisenborn. While there she was surrounded by her friends but was deeply unhappy over the affair. Their arguments led her friend Ingeborg, who viewed the marriage as being in a critical state, to see them less and less as the summer progressed. In April 1941, Schulze-Boysen gave up the idea of turning her ship journal into a novel. This was a result of a shortage of paper, and the fact that novels were no longer published unless for propaganda purposes.

=== Hochverrat ===
In March 1941, Harro met with Korotkov directly in Harnack's apartment and he agreed to provide military information for him. Korotkov asked Schulze-Boysen to curtail his resistance activities but Shulze-Boysen replied that as a German patriot he wished to create a "counterpublic" to the Nazis and his resistance would work needed to continue.

In April 1941, in an attempt to increase the influx of intelligence, the Soviets ordered Korotkov to create a Berlin espionage operation and Harnack was asked by Korotkov to run it. Korotkov was instructed by Soviet intelligence to provide a person in Berlin that could be contacted via radio in the event of war. Harnack refused to be contacted in that manner and agreed only to collect and encipher the material in his own apartment, but the transmission would take place somewhere else. Instead Adam Kuckhoff would be the radio contact. In June 1941, with Harnack's approval, Korotkov delivered a wireless transmitter to Greta Kuckhoff during a meeting at an underground railway station. However the radio was damaged by Erdberg before delivery. Adam Kuckhoff arranged with Harnack to return the damaged radio back to Erdberg. A Luftwaffe report consisting of the Russian city names and their railway stations that were to be bombed during the initial attack of Operation Barbarossa had to be manually transcribed to Erdberg, instead of being transmitted. Greta Kuckhoff was unable to accurately remember the place names written in the Cyrillic alphabet, so instead Libertas along with Adam Kuckhoff met Erdberg in the Potsdamer Platz station to manually whisper the list of cities to Erdberg, repeating the names to Erdberg so he would remember them while they walked back and forward along the station, over several hours.

In August 1941, during a dinner party that Karbe and his wife held with the Schule-Boysens, he described how Libertas had blurted out the fact they were in the resistance, while they were discussing Harro working for Hermann Göring. This led Karbe to describe the consequences of their actions should they be discovered, which made Libertas scream. At the time. the daily fear of discovery was palpable and made the days run slow. They knew that the groups actions were considered treasonous, specifically Hochverrat or "High Treason" and punishable by death, but could do little to change it. Karbe was never part of the resistance and he believed that Libertas has little understanding of the danger they were currently in. In the same month, Karbe put the couple in touch with Anna Krauss, a fortune-teller, who became an important part of the group.

In September 1941, Schulze-Boysen met Cato Bontjes van Beek while on an assignement at the Leipzig Trade Fair and became friends. Van Beek was an ardent anti-Nazi and agreed to collaborate with her, by helping her write up the Nazi crimes in her archive. In the autumn of 1941, Cato rented two rooms from Schulze-Boyson that were part of her very large apartment at 2 Waitzstrasse. Van Beek's lover, the journalist and poet Heinz Strelow rented on the rooms directly from Van Beek.

== Documenting war crimes ==
In August 1940, the Reich Ministry of Public Enlightenment and Propaganda created the Deutsche KulturfilmZentrale (German Documentary Film Institute) whose purpose was to organise the production of ten to twenty minute long cultural films, that were to be shown in German film theatres, before the start of the main film, for the purpose of propaganda Libertas applied for a position in the department of Kunst, deutsches Land und Volk, Völker und Länder (Art, German Land and People, Peoples and Countries) and was appointed on 1 November 1941. In the position she acted as a censor, reviewing film scripts to determine if they adhered to Nazi Party ideology. Those that did not she would reject; filmmakers who she found to be trying to be innovative were passed. On her first day at work, she found her desk piled high with envelopes filled with photographs containing images of the work of the Sonderbehandlungen task forces. Joseph Goebbels had ordered the collection of photographs from the front so they can be used by Libertas to define themes for new cultural films. As part of her job, she had to continue requesting pictures from soldiers on leave.

For a long while Schulze-Boysen did not know how to react to the material as it was so shocking. She decided to start gathering pictorial evidence of Nazi war crimes, in anticipation of using them after the war to show the extent of the genocide.

== AGIS leaflets ==
In December 1941, the Schulze-Boysens met the psychoanalyst John Rittmeister and his wife Eva. Through Rittmeister, several people who attended the Heil'schen Abendschule Abendgymnasium ("Berliner Städtische Abendgymnasium für Erwachsene") (BAG) in Schöneberg including Rittmeister's wife, Eva, who became part of the espionage group. This included the lawyer Maria Terwiel and her fiancée, the dentist Helmut Himpel as well as the factory worker Friedrich Rehmer and the student Ursula Goetze. Rittmeister was happy to hear from the reports that informed him of the German military setback on the Eastern Front and convinced Schulze-Boysen that the reports should be shared with the German people, which would destroy the myth of German propaganda. The group decide to write a series of reports known as "AGIS", a name chosen by Libertas who named in reference to the Spartan King Agis IV, who was a social reformer who fought against corruption. Rittmeister, Schulze-Boysen, Heinz Strelow, and Küchenmeister among others, wrote them with titles like The becoming of the Nazi movement, Call for opposition, Freedom and violence and Appeal to All Callings and Organisations to resist the government.

By 15 February 1942, Schulze-Boysen had written a six-page pamphlet titled Die Sorge Um Deutschlands Zukunft geht durch das Volk! ("The Concern for Germany's Future Goes Through the People!"). Co-authored by Rittmeister, the master copy was arranged by Van Beek, and the pamphlet was written up by Terwiel on her typewriter. One copy survives today. The pamphlet posited the idea of active defeatism, which was a compromise between principled pacifism and practical political resistance. It stated the future for Germany lay in establishing a socialist state that would form alliances with the USSR and progressive forces in Europe. It also offered advice to the individual resistor: "do the opposite of what is asked of you". The group produced hundreds of pamphlets that were spread over Berlin, left in phone boxes, in eating establishments and sent to selected addresses, for example universities. Producing the leaflets required a small army of people and a complex approach to organisation to avoid being discovered.

== Fears and protests ==
Adhesive stickers that were posted on top of The Soviet Paradise posters

The couple spent Christmas holidays 1941 apart with Libertas spending Christmas in Liebenberg Castle with her cousin Ingeborg von Schoenebeck, who had a strong dislike of Harro and tried to convince Libertas that she should divorce. By 1942, the unrelenting stress of the resistance work began to tell. In early 1942, Van Beek and Strelow realised the terrible danger they were in, and began to withdraw from the group and their resistance activities. In the spring of 1942, Schulze-Boysen confided in Günther Weisenborn that for five years she had worked to resist the Nazis on behalf of Harro, but she found that she could not face the fear any longer. She yearned simply to live, in love and peace.

On 16 May 1942, she visited Vienna for four days to conduct a meeting with the Wien-Film film company. While she was away, the group protested the Nazi propaganda exhibition called The Soviet Paradise (German original title "Das Sowjet-Paradies") in Lustgarten, that had the express purpose of justifying the invasion of the Soviet Union to the German people. The protest took the form of small stickers with a message Permanent Exhibition, The Nazi Paradise, War, Hunger, Lies, Gestapo, How much longer? that were pasted up in several German neighbourhoods. On 18 May 1942, Herbert Baum led a group to commit an arson attack on the exhibition. While the arson attack was not reported, 500 Berlin based Jewish men were rounded up and deported to concenctration camps in a reprisal.

When she returned from Vienna, she discovered Harro in flagrante with the actor Stella Mahlberg with whom he had been having an affair since April 1941. She immediately demanded a divorce stating she would seek legal advice from Herbert Engelsing but Harro convinced her to stay, informing her that they knew too much about the resistance effort. Harro Schulze-Boysen continued the affair until August 1942. Libertas found the lack of emotional support highly distressing.

== Letters from the Eastern Front ==
Through 1941 and 1942, Schulze-Boysen continued working with the Deutsche KulturfilmZentrale. In January 1942, she wrote to her mother-in-law Marie Louise, where she described the work, which she completes at home and spoke of how it made her deeply unhappy and melancholic. In May 1942, Schulze-Boysen met Alexander Spoerl who held similar political views. Spoerl was the son of the German author Heinrich Spoerl. At a party at the Engelsings and in an open conversation, she suggested that Spoerl become her assistant at the KulturfilmZentrale, to help her organise the pictures into an archive. However, the number of pictures in envelopes continued to increase. Schulze-Boysen decided to answer some of the letters she received, in an effort to collect more details for after the war. In one photograph she archives, it contains an image of a little girl next to her older brother, mother and a baby. All of them are to be shot. In another letter she received, a soldier spoke in lyrical terms of certain insects that he loved and could not harm, one was the potato beetle and included a photograph of him about to hurl a small baby against the wall. Libertas along with Adam Kuckhoff and the journalist John Sieg use some of the letters material to write a fictional letter to fictional police captain that stated:

"Would I otherwise write to you if I did not assume that you have not lost the ability and courage to follow the compulsion of conscience where it comes into conflict with such an obviously bestial "duty" as the ordered assassination of the Soviet population? In the state hospital in [...] I recently visited some police comrades who had been brought in from the East because of nervous breakdowns, all of them. You know the hospital atmosphere, this special kind of peace, the room was also enlivened with flowers, the sick were allowed to listen to music, and this ridiculously simple requiem of emotional healing was joined by, almost novelistic, literally, a few rays of sunshine. By the way, there is a department there about which my comrades told me with almost shy relief that the even worse nervous breakdowns were there: the powerful police officers from the past just keep moving along hopping, like kangaroos, you know, and others crawl on all fours, shaking carefully as they do so their heads, their hair falls disheveled over their faces, and their gaze is, someone repeated imploringly, “like a St. Bernard dog". I experienced many terrible things from my comrades; the calm in the room was deceptive, the furies were raging in it. In whispers, with eyes wide open and hoping for a word of redeeming justification from me, I was told about mass shootings of the civilian population in Russia, selected atrocities, about blood and tears without measure, the ultimate character of the beastly SS orders, the incomprehensible equanimity of helpless victims, yes, and of course there was a lot about the partisan struggle, which interested me immensely politically and tactically. Of course, I didn't say a word of consolation to any of the sick people that would have been of help to them in the horror-tormented twilight hours of their evenings, which made them all the more eager to reveal their deeds. Should I of all people give a kind of absolution to someone who subsequently, albeit in agony confess that he shot 50 people morning after morning on orders, so to speak, as a daily routine for months"

The letter was duplicated in a hectograph machine. Kurt Schumacher took several copies when he returned to his unit in Poznan and the group hoped for a snowball effect in its distribution, to see the letter pass up the chain of command.

== Discovery ==
The discovery of the illegal radio transmissions by Soviet agent Johann Wenzel by the German radio counterintelligence organization Funkabwehr and his capture by the Gestapo on 29–30 June 1942 eventually exposed the group and led to the arrest of the Schulze-Boyzen's. Wenzel decided to cooperate after he was tortured. His exposure of the radio codes enabled Referat 12, the cipher bureaux of the Funkabwehr, to decipher Red Orchestra message traffic. The unit had been tracking Red Orchestra radio transmissions since June 1941 and had located Wenzel's house in Brussels. When it was raided by the Gestapo it was found to contain a large number of coded messages. When Wilhelm Vauck, principal cryptographer of the Funkabwehr, the radio counterintelligence department of the Abwehr, received the ciphers from Wenzel, he was able to decipher some of the older messages. On 15 July 1942, Vauck managed to decrypt a message dated 10 October 1941that gave the locations of the Kuckhoff's and the Schulze-Boysen's apartments.

== Arrest ==
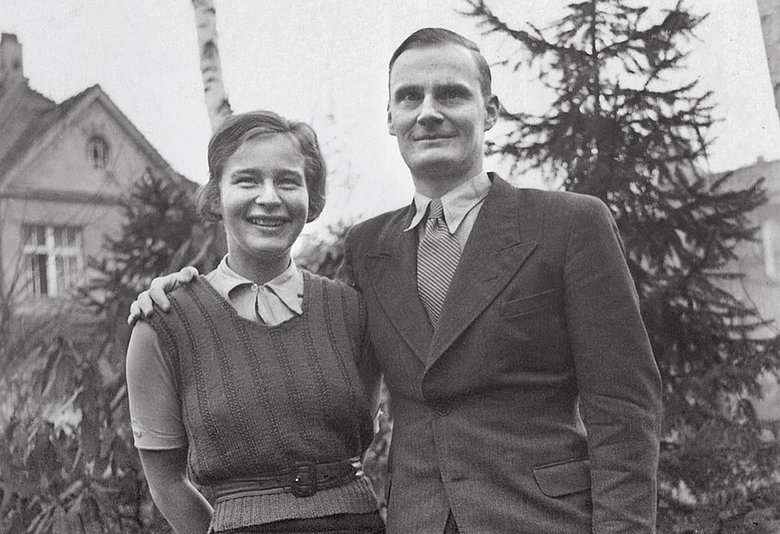
Libs and Harro. The picture was taken in 1935

On 31 August 1942, Harro Schulze-Boysen was arrested in his office in the Ministry of Aviation. Libertas had received a puzzling phone call from his office several days before. She was also warned by the women who delivered her mail that the Gestapo were monitoring it. Libertas's assistant Alexander Spoerl also noticed that Adam Kuckhoff had gone missing while working in Prague. On 7 September 1942, the Harnacks were arrested while on holiday.

On the same day Libertas returned to an empty apartment after a short business trip and called Harro's secretary to try and locate him. She suspected that Schulze-Boysen was arrested and contacted the Engelsings. Herbert Engelsing tried to contact Kuckhoff without result. Libertas and Spoerl both started to panic and frantically tried to warn others. They destroyed the darkroom at the Kulurefilm center and Libertas destroyed her meticulously collected archive. At home, she packed a suitcase with all Harro Schulze-Boysen's papers and then tried to fabricate evidence of loyalty to the Nazi state by writing fake letters. She sent the suitcase to Günther Weisenborn in the vain hope that it could be hidden, and he tried to contact Harro Schulze-Boysen in vain. On the same day, she was informed by Horst Heilmann that Harro had been arrested.

On 8 September, while on a train to visit friends in the Moselle Valley, Libertas was arrested. She was taken to the basement cells (German:Hausgefängnis) in the most dreaded address in all of German-occupied Europe, Reich Security Main Office headquarters at 8 Prinz-Albert-Straße (Prince Albert street) containing department AMT IV, the Gestapo and put into protective custody (Schutzhäftlinge) by them.

In prison, Libertas met Gertrude Breiter, the secretary for Libertas's interrogator, Kommissar Alfred Göpfert. Libertas believed that Breiter was hostile to her superiors, seeing her more as a friend than an agent provocateur Breiter told Libertas that Göpfert did not have any serious evidence against her and due to her family connections with Hermann Göring, her life would be safe. Libertas decided to confide in Breiter and talked with her more than a dozen times. In the course of their furtive conversations, Libertas told Breiter what she knew of the other prisoners, asked Breiter to deliver letters to her mother and asked for additional favours, primarily in the form of a typewriter to write poetry. In the three months Libertas was in prison, she wrote a number of remarkable letters and poems to her mother and friends.

When the Gestapo informed her of Breiter's betrayal, Libertas was overwhelmed with remorse, stating in a letter to her mother, "I had to drink the bitter cup for now I learn that the person whom I had given my complete trust Gertrude Breiter had betrayed me." Her mother believed that Libertas had betrayed a number of the Schulze-Boysen/Harnack group. However, in an unpublished interview with David Dallin after the war, Manfred Roeder, the advocate who prosecuted the Schulze-Boysens in the Reichskriegsgericht, stated that Libertas never betrayed anybody. Roeder credited the Funkspiel operation the Abwehr ran against the Red Orchestra radio operators for providing the necessary clues to identify the resistance members.

On 15 November 1942, Gurevich was brought back to Berlin where he was asked by the Gestapo on 22 November 1942 to identify the name of a woman in a picture. He identified her immediately as Libertas Schulze-Boysen. This provided definitive proof to the investigators that she was actively involved in the work of her husband.

== Trial and execution ==
She and her husband were brought before trial in the Reichskriegsgericht ("Reich Court Martial"). She was charged with "preparation" to commit high treason, helping the enemy and espionage. Her husband was charged with preparation to commit high treason, wartime treason, military sabotage and espionage. The trial ended on 19 December 1942 with death sentences for both her husband and her. Libertas Schulze-Boysen was executed by guillotine about 90 minutes after her husband on 22 December 1942 at Plötzensee Prison in Berlin.

== Awards and honours ==
- The German writer Alexander Spoerl dedicated his 1950 novel, Memoiren eines mittelmässigen Schülers (Memoirs of a Mediocre Student) to Libertas Schulze-Boysen.
- The Libertas Chapel in Liebenberg Castle, where she married her husband Harro, is dedicated to her. Since 2004, a special exhibition by the Memorial to the German Resistance on the life of Libertas and the joint resistance within the Red Orchestra against Nazism has been on display here – documented with photographs and extensive writings.
- In 2017, two Stolpersteine (stumbling stones) each for Libertas and her husband Harro were laid in front of the steps of the entrance to the Liebenberg Castle.
Memorials to the Schulze-Boysen's

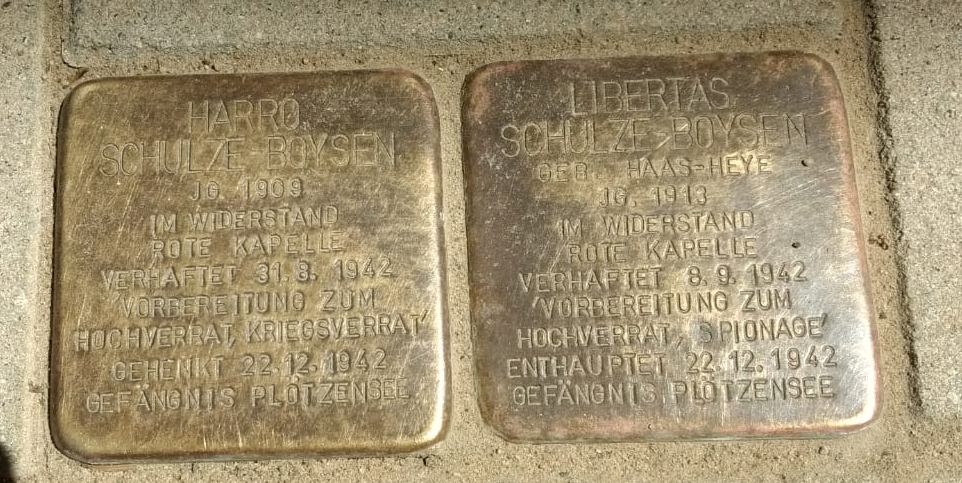
Stolperstein for the Schulze-Boysens in the castle courtyard of Liebenberg Castle

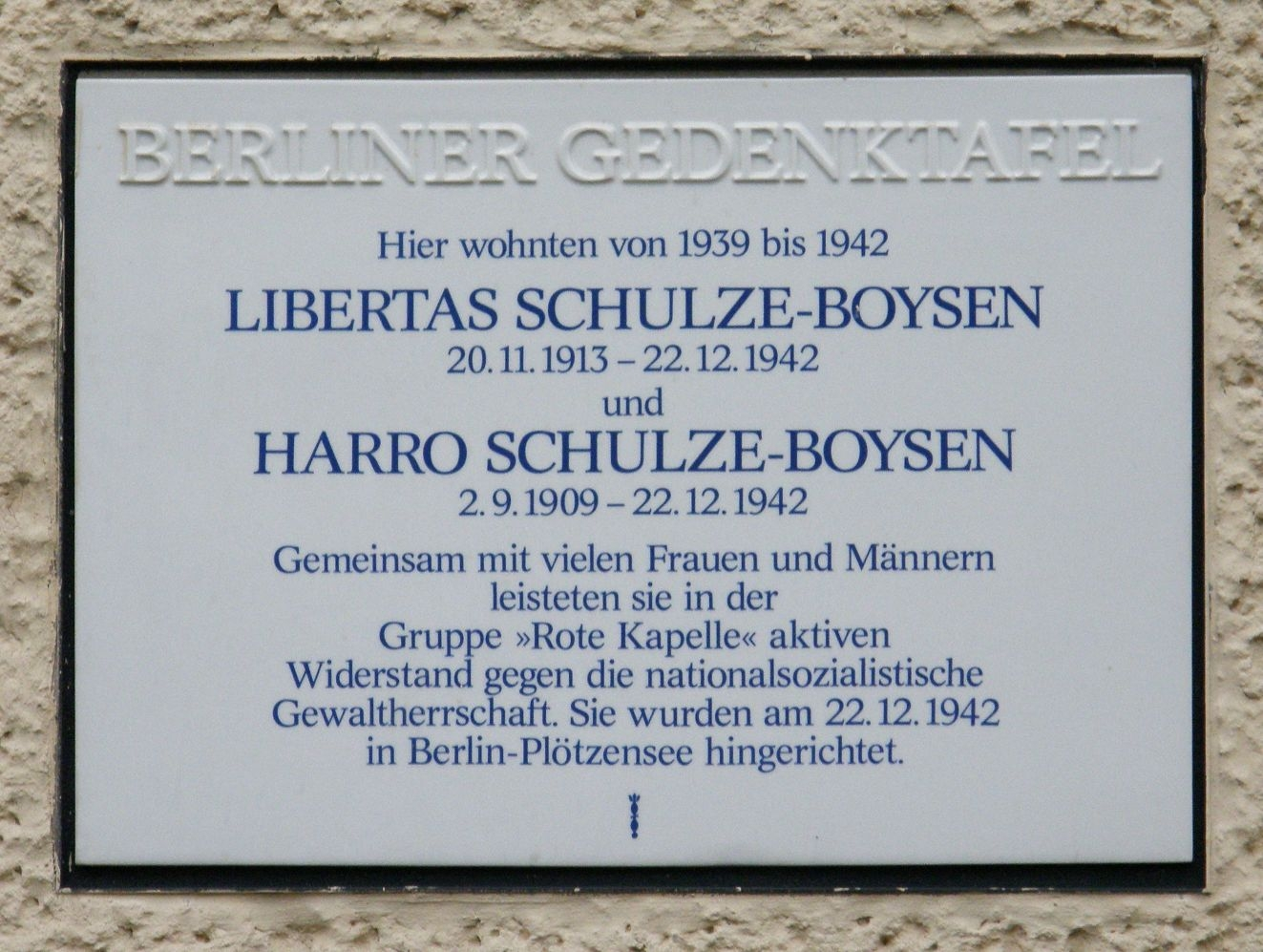
Memorial plaque for the couple at Haus Altenburger Allee 19 in Westend of Berlin

== Odonymy ==
- In the Berlin borough of Lichtenberg in 1972, a street was named after the Schulze-Boysens.

== See also ==
- Arvid Harnack
- Hans Coppi
- List of Germans who resisted Nazism
- Resistance during World War II

== Bibliography ==
- Andresen, Geertje (1 November 2005). Oda Schottmüller: Die Tänzerin, Bildhauerin und Nazigegnerin Oda Schottmüller (1905–1943). Lukas Verlag. ISBN 978-3-936872-58-3.
- Beachy, Robert (December 2010). "The German Invention of Homosexuality". The Journal of Modern History. 82 (4). The University of Chicago Press: 801–838. doi:10.1086/656077. JSTOR 10.1086/656077. S2CID 142605226.
- Bergt, Heike (8 September 2017). "Pfarrer im Unruhestand" (in German). Märkische Verlags- und Druckgesellschaft mbH Potsdam. Märkische Allgemeine. Archived from the original on 12 August 2021.
- Brysac, Shareen Blair (2000). Resisting Hitler: Mildred Harnack and the Red Orchestra. New York: Oxford University Press. ISBN 978-0-19-513269-4.
- Brysac, Shareen Blair (23 May 2002). Resisting Hitler: Mildred Harnack and the Red Orchestra. Oxford University Press. ISBN 978-0-19-992388-5.
- Bytwerk, Randall L. (2004). "Zeitschriften-Dienst". German Propaganda Archive. Grand Rapids: Calvin University. Archived from the original on 14 February 2024.
- Cocks, Geoffrey (1985). Psychotherapy in the Third Reich : the Göring Institute. Oxford: Oxford University Press. ISBN 0195034619.
- Coppi, Hans (1995). Harro Schulze-Boysen, Wege in den Widerstand : eine biographische Studie [Harro Schulze-Boysen, Paths to Resistance: a biographical study] (in German) (2nd ed.). Koblenz: D. Fölbach. ISBN 3-923532-28-8. OCLC 243801569.
- Coppi, Hans; Tuchel, Johannes (2013). Libertas Schulze-Boysen und die Rote Kapelle (PDF). Berlin: Gedenkstätte Deutscher Widerstand Berlinauf Schloss & Gut Liebenberg. ISBN 978-3-926082-55-8.
- Dallin, David J. (1955). Soviet Espionage. Yale University Press. p. 247. ISBN 978-0-598-41349-9.
- Jörg Echternkamp; Zentrum für Militärgeschichte und Sozialwissenschaften der Bundeswehr (Potsdam, Allemagne) (1990). Germany and the Second World War. Deutsche Reich und der Zweite Weltkrieg. Vol. 9. Oxford: Oxford University Press. ISBN 9780199542963.
- Geyken, Frauke (2015). "Etwas Furchtbares wird passieren" [Something terrible will happen]. Damals (in German). 47 (5). Leinfelden-Echterdingen: Konradin Mediengruppe: 72–76. ISSN 0011-5908.
- Geyken, Frauke (9 May 2014). Wir standen nicht abseits: Frauen im Widerstand gegen Hitler (in German). C.H.Beck. p. 79. ISBN 978-3-406-65903-4.
- Hastings, Max (2015). The Secret War: Spies, Codes and Guerrillas 1939–1945. London: William Collins. ISBN 978-0-00-750374-2.
- Geyer, Michael; Tooze, Adam (23 April 2015). The Cambridge History of the Second World War: Volume 3, Total War: Economy, Society and Culture. Cambridge University Press. ISBN 978-1-316-29880-0.
- Hellman, John (15 November 2002). Communitarian Third Way: Alexandre Marc and Ordre Nouveau, 1930-2000. McGill-Queen's Press – MQUP. ISBN 978-0-7735-2376-0.
- Höhne, Heinz (16 June 1968). "ptx ruft moskau". Der Spiegel (in German).
- Juchler, Ingo; Ambauen, Ladina; Arnold, Maren (25 October 2017). Mildred Harnack und die Rote Kapelle in Berlin. Universitätsverlag Potsdam. ISBN 978-3-86956-407-4.
- Kettelhake, Silke (2008). "Erzähl allen, allen von mir!" : das schöne kurze Leben der Libertas Schulze-Boysen 1913-1942 [Tell everyone, everyone about me!' – The beautiful, short life of Libertas Schulze-Boysen, 1913–1942] (in German). Münich: Droemer. ISBN 9783426274378. OCLC 221130666.
- Kesaris, Paul. L, ed. (1979). The Rote Kapelle: the CIA's history of Soviet intelligence and espionage networks in Western Europe, 1936–1945. Washington DC: University Publications of America. ISBN 978-0-89093-203-2.
- Nelson, Anne (7 April 2009). Red Orchestra: The Story of the Berlin Underground and the Circle of Friends Who Resisted Hitler. Random House Publishing Group. ISBN 978-1-58836-799-0.
- Ohler, Norman; Mohr, Tim; Yarbrough, Marshall (14 July 2020). The Bohemians : the lovers who led Germany's resistance against the Nazis. Boston: Houghton Mifflin Harcourt. ISBN 9781328566232.
- Perrault, Gilles (1969). The Red Orchestra. New York: Schocken Books. ISBN 0805209522.
- Petrescu, Corina L. (2010). Against All Odds: Models of Subversive Spaces in National Socialist Germany. Peter Lang. ISBN 978-3-03911-845-8.
- Pučan, Lukáš (2008). Bakalarska's works (PDF) (Thesis). Faculty of Arts Department of German, Nordic and Dutch Studies, Masaryk University.
- Schulze-Boysen, Harro (1999). Dieser Tod paßt zu mir [This death suits me] (in German). Aufbau-Verlag. ISBN 978-3-351-02493-2.
- Schulze-Boysen, Harro; Rittmeister, John; van Beek, Cato Bontjes; Terwiel, Maria; Schulze-Boysen, Libertas; Küchenmeister, Walter (6 March 1942). Die Sorge um Deutschlands Zukunft geht durch das Volk (PDF). Gedenkstätte Deutscher Widerstand: AGIS.
- Schulze-Boysen, Harro (13 August 1936). Schulze-Boysen: Bericht über Sprachstudienreise nach Schweden vom 13 August 1936 [Report on language study trip to Sweden] (Report). Munich: Institute of Contemporary History. p. Archive: ED 335/2.
- "Libertas Schulze-Boysen". Gedenkstätte Deutscher Widerstand (in German). German Resistance Memorial Center.
- "Maria Terwiel". Gedenkstätte Deutscher Widerstand. German Resistance Memorial Center.
- Tyas, Stephen (2017). SS-Major Horst Kopkow : from the Gestapo to British intelligence. Stroud: Fonthill. ISBN 9781781555989. OCLC 1013591260.
- Vinke, Hermann (2007). Cato Bontjes van Beek - "Ich habe nicht um mein Leben gebettelt" ein Porträt ["I didn't beg for my life" a portrait]. Btb, 73672 (in German) (Genehmigte Taschenbuchausg., 1. Aufl ed.). München: Goldmann. ISBN 9783442736720.
- West, Nigel (12 November 2007). Historical Dictionary of World War II Intelligence. Scarecrow Press. ISBN 978-0-8108-6421-4.
