= Liane Berkowitz =

German resistance fighter (1923–1943)

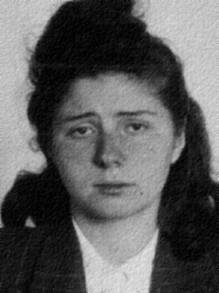
- Berkowitz in her prison photo, 1943
- Born: 7 August 1923; Berlin, Weimar Republic
- Died: 5 August 1943 (aged 19); Plötzensee Prison; Berlin, Nazi Germany
- Cause of death: Decapitation
- Monuments: A Stolperstein near her home
- Occupation: Resistance member
- Known for: Member of Rote Kapelle (Red Orchestra) resistance group
- Spouse: Friedrich Rehmer (m. 1942; died 1943)
- Children: 1
- Parents: Victor Vasilyev (father); Catherine Jewsienko (mother)

Liane Berkowitz (7 August 1923 – 5 August 1943) was a German resistance fighter and was most notable for being a member of the Berlin-based pro-Soviet resistance group that coalesced around Harro Schulze-Boysen, that was later called the Red Orchestra by the Abwehr. Arrested and sentenced to death, she was executed shortly after she gave birth to a daughter in custody.

== Life ==
Liane Berkowitz was born in Berlin, the daughter of conductor Victor Vasilyev and the singing teacher Catherine Jewsienko. Shortly before her birth, her parents had fled the Soviet Union. When Liane's father died, her mother Catherine married Henry Berkowitz, who immediately adopted Liane in 1930. The family lived on Viktoria-Luise-Platz in the Schöneberg district. Henry Berkowitz reportedly emigrated abroad after his divorce in 1939. The fate of Liane's mother is unknown.

== Red Orchestra ==
Liane was fluent in German and Russian. Henry arranged for her education at the private Heilsche Abendschule gymnasium where she prepared for her Abitur qualification from 1941. There, she joined some friends whose group coalesced around her schoolmate Eva Rittmeister and the latter's husband, the neurologist John Rittmeister. Ursula Goetze, Otto Gollnow, Fritz Thiel, and Friedrich Rehmer also belonged to the group. Under the guidance of John Rittmeister, the friends started to resist against Hitler's regime, and who would later work against the Nazis together with the left-leaning pro-Soviet resistance movement that was led by the Luftwaffe officer Harro Schulze-Boysen. Liane became engaged to Friedrich Rehmer and was pregnant when she was arrested.

Together with Otto Gollnow, while her fiancé was severely wounded in the hospital, Berkowitz pasted about 100 adhesive stickers saying

Adhesive stickers that were posted on top of The Soviet Paradise posters

Permanent Exhibition
The Nazi Paradise
War, Hunger, Lies, Gestapo
How much longer?

on the evening of 17 May 1942 in the busy area between Kurfürstendamm and Uhlandstrasse. This was intended as a protest against The Soviet Paradise exhibition organised by the Nazi Party Propaganda Office, that took place at the Berlin Lustgarten. They also wanted to show that anti-National Socialist resistance in Germany was still active. It is not certain whether during this action Berkowitz and Gollnow were discreetly accompanied and protected by Harro Schulze-Boysen. The stickers were created by Fritz Thiel and his wife Hannelore who printed stickers using a child's toy rubber stamp kit.

== Arrest ==
Berkowitz was arrested and charged on 26 September 1942. Friedrich Rehmer was still in a Wehrmacht hospital in Britz, where he was recuperating from a serious war injury he had suffered on the Eastern Front. He was arrested in his hospital ward on 29 November. On 18 January 1943, the Second Senate of the Reichskriegsgericht court-martial convicted Berkowitz and Rehmer together with other friends involved in the adhesive label action "for aiding the preparation of high treason and aiding the enemy," and sentenced them to death. Liane's and Friedrich's daughter Irina was born on 12 April 1943 in the Barnimstrasse women's prison.

As the Reichskriegsgericht pronounced the sentence recommendation when checking with Adolf Hitler to dismiss the pregnant Liane Berkowitz from prison, he expressly rejected any reprieve. The death sentence was confirmed by Field Marshal Wilhelm Keitel and countersigned.

The young mother was executed in Plötzensee Prison at 7.45 p.m on 5 August 1943. Friedrich Rehmer had already been executed as early as on 13 May 1943. In 2013 it was revealed by the BBC that her body, like thousands of others, was delivered to anatomist Hermann Stieve to be dissected for research. Her final resting place is unknown. Her daughter Irina died on 16 October 1943 in the hospital in Eberswalde under unclear circumstances.

Berkowitz was a member of the Russian Orthodox Church. Her letters from death row are marked by a deep faith. The Catholic prison chaplain Peter Buchholz enabled her to receive the Holy Communion on the day of her death.

== Honours ==
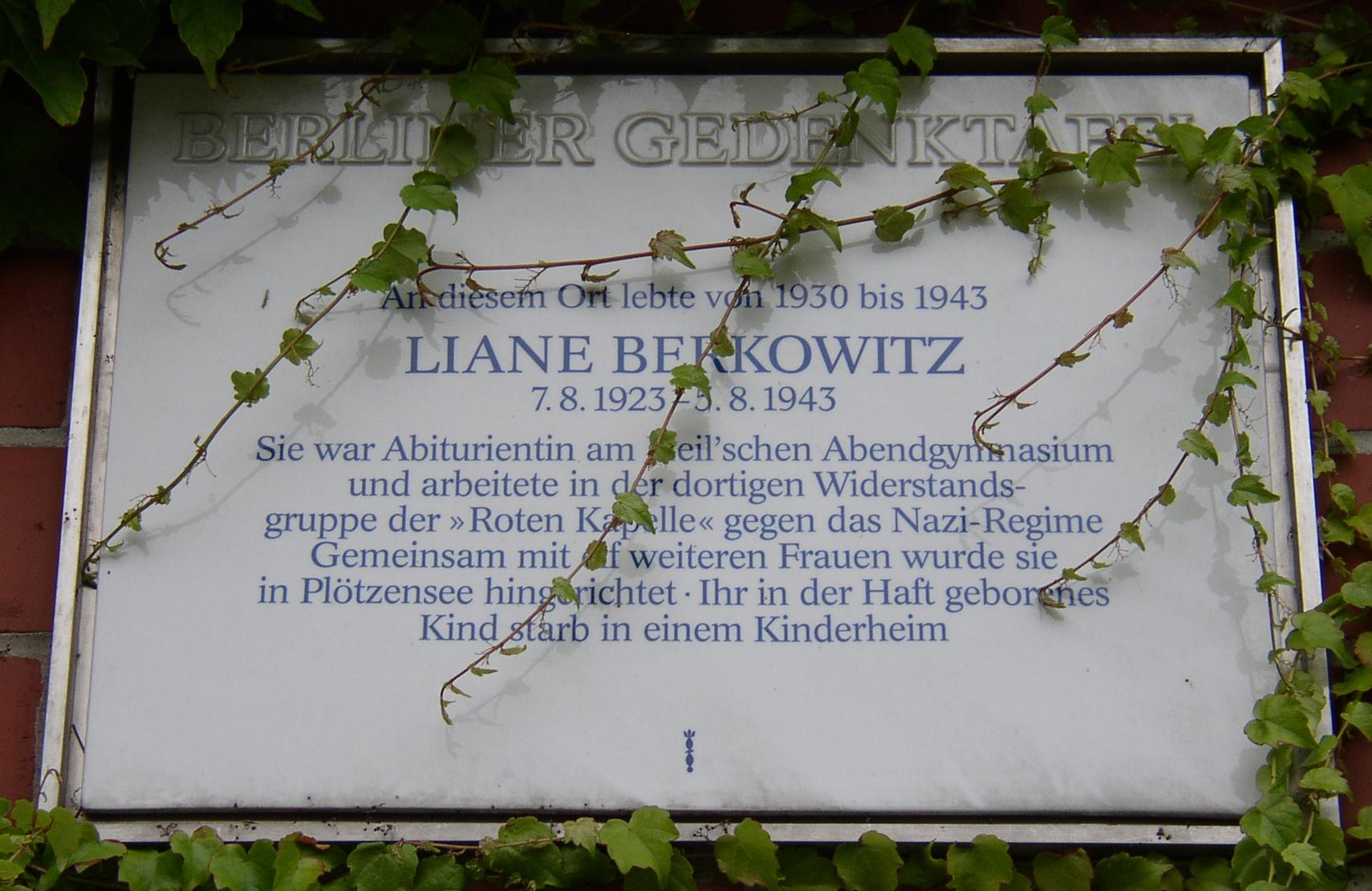
Memorial plaque in Berlin-Schöneberg, Viktoria-Luise-Platz 1

- A memorial stele in the honour of Liane Berkowitz and other resistance fighters was erected in the courtyard of the Berlin Humboldt University on Unter den Linden in 1976
- A memorial plaque marks her former residence on Viktoria-Luise-Platz No. 1 in Berlin-Schöneberg
- On 18 January 2000, a square in the Berlin district of Friedenau was named Liane-Berkowitz-Platz.

== Literature ==
- Gélieu, Claudia von (1994). Frauen in Haft : Gefängnis Barnimstrasse : eine Justizgeschichte (in German). Berlin: Elefanten Press. ISBN 3-88520-530-0. OCLC 33452421.
- Griebel, Regina; Coburger, Marlies; Scheel, Heinrich (1992). Erfasst? : das Gestapo-Album zur Roten Kapelle : eine Foto-Dokumentation (in German). Halle: Audioscop. pp. 222, 372. ISBN 9783883840444. OCLC 29316949.
- Rosiejka, Gert (1986). Die Rota Kappelle : Landesverrat als antifaschististischer Widerstand (in German). Hamburg: Ergebnisse Verlag. ISBN 9783925622168. OCLC 497259004.
- Schilde, Kurt; Laurien, Hanna-Renate (1992). Eva-Maria Buch und die "Rote Kapelle" : Erinnerungen an den Widerstand gegen den Nationalsozialismus (1. Auflage ed.). Berlin: Overall. ISBN 3-925961-06-2. OCLC 71261539. (In this volume, the prison letters and secret messages from Liane Berkowitz were printed).
