= Eva Rittmeister =

German resistance fighter

Eva Rittmeister

Eva Rittmeister (born 5 July 1913 in Zeitz, died 19 July 2004 in Remchingen) was a German paediatric nurse, later office worker who became a resistance fighter against the Nazis. During World War II, Rittmeister became involved a Berlin-based resistance group that later became known as the Red Orchestra ("Rote Kapelle").

== Life ==
Eve Rittmeister née Knieper was the daughter of a merchant. After school, Rittmeister initially trained as a paediatric nurse, then worked as an office worker. Several sources indicate, however, that she was an actress.

In 1939, Rittmeister married John Rittmeister who was a neurologist and psychoanalyst and fifteen years older than her, aged 40. John Rittmeister considered her "life-affirming", who often enriched his life by relieving his chronic depression.

== Education ==
To prepare for her Abitur in 1940, Rittmeister attended the Heil'schen Abendschule Abendgymnasium ("Berliner Städtische Abendgymnasium für Erwachsene") (BAG) at Berlin W 50, Augsburger Straße 60 in Schöneberg. While there she met a number of people that would eventually become close friends including Ursula Goetze, Liane Berkowitz, Fritz Thiel and Friedrich Rehmer. They gradually formed a group of young people that met to discuss ideological, humanist and political views that gradually led to their opposition to Nazis.

== Rote Kapelle ==
In December 1941, Eva and her husband met Harro Schulze-Boysen and his wife, the aristocrat Libertas Schulze-Boysen.

== Arrest ==
On 26 September 1942, Eva and her husband were arrested by the Gestapo while at home. Eva was temporarily released but re-arrested on 5 January 1943. Her husband was sentenced to the death penalty by the 2nd Senate of the Reichskriegsgericht "for preparation for high treason and enemy favouritism". During the same trial Eva was sentenced to three years in prison "for listening to enemy transmitters". On 13 May 1943, John Rittmeister was executed by the guillotine in Plötzensee Prison. Eva was released in April 1945 by the Red Army and survived the end of the war.

== Awards ==
In 1979, Rittmeister received the John F. Rittmeister Medal from the Gesellschaft für Ärztliche Psychotherapie (GÄP) (East German Society for Medical Psychotherapy) of the GDR in recognition of her special services to psychotherapy and social psychiatry. The medal was awarded to 21 people, only three of whom were women. In addition to Eva Rittmeister, the medal was awarded to the German psychotherapists Irene Blumenthal and Leipzig professor Christa Kohler
