= Werner Krauss (academic) =

German academic (1900–1976)

- Born: 7 June 1900; Stuttgart, Württemberg, Germany
- Died: 26 August 1976; Berlin, East Germany
- Occupations: University professor Anti-Nazi activist
- Political party: KPD (1945–1946); SED (1947–1976)
- Spouse: Doris Schumacher
- Parent(s): Rudolf Krauss; Ottilie Schüle

Werner Krauss (7 June 1900 – 28 August 1976) was a German university professor (Romance studies).

During the 1940s he became a political activist and resistance fighter against the Nazi regime. In 1943 he was found guilty of preparing to commit high treason and condemned to death. Following the intervention of influential fellow-intellectuals the sentence was commuted to a five-year prison term in 1944.

== Life ==
=== Provenance and early years ===
Werner Krauss was the son of the archivist-scholar Rudolf Krauss and his wife, born Ottilie Schüle. Werner's mother's sister was the mother of Eberhard Koebel. In June 1918 Werner Krauss successfully completed his schooling at the Eberhard-Ludwigs-Gymnasium in Stuttgart, after which he was conscripted into the wartime army.

Discharged from the army in 1919, Krauss went on to study Literary sciences at the Ludwig-Maximilians-Universität München and the Friedrich Wilhelm University of Berlin, with a particular focus on Romance studies.

Between 1922 and 1926 he lived in Spain, studying at the Complutense University of Madrid. For his doctorate he was supervised by Karl Vossler (who had also taught Victor Klemperer) at the Ludwig-Maximilians-Universität München for a study of daily life and literature in Medieval Spain, which was subsequently published.

He moved to Marburg in April 1931, taking a post as an assistant at Marburg University, and received his habilitation qualification a year later, this time for a piece of work entitled "The development of the bucolic in Spanish Literature", for which he was supervised by Erich Auerbach. Shortly after this politics intervened at the beginning of 1933 when the Nazi party took power and lost little time in imposing their version of a one-party dictatorship on Germany. Auerbach lost his post at Marburg because he was Jewish, and Krauss took over Auerbach's teaching responsibilities, which normally would have gone hand in hand with a professorship. However, in the case of Werner Krauss the teaching duties came without the professorship because he was believed by those in charge to be ideologically unreliable.

=== Nazi years ===
On 11 November 1933, a ceremony was held at the Albert Hall in Leipzig to celebrate the "National Socialist Revolution". As part of the celebration many mainstream academics (and others) signed a declaration of which the character can be inferred from the title: "With Adolf Hitler for the German People’s Honour, law and liberty" ("Mit Adolf Hitler für des deutschen Volkes Ehre, Freiheit und Recht!"). Werner Krauss was one of approximately 900 who signed it.

War returned in 1939, and in August 1940 Krauss was conscripted into the army, ending up in a special company of simultaneous translators: this involved relocating to Berlin, although the work also included front-line assignments.

In Berlin, through his friendship with the psychiatrist John Rittmeister Krauss came into contact with the resistance activist Harro Schulze-Boysen. Krauss and his girlfriend, Ursula Goetze, now participated in a "sticker campaign" against a high-profile exhibition being held in the Lustgarten park in May/June 1942, which carried the ironic title "The Soviet Paradise". This led to their identification as what the Gestapo termed Red Orchestra ("Rote Kapelle") members and Krauss was arrested in November 1942.

On 18 January 1943 they were both found guilty as accessories to High treason by the National War Court and condemned to death. As well as the incident involving the "sticker campaign", Krauss was condemned under the Law on extraordinary broadcast actions ("Verordnung über außerordentliche Rundfunkmaßnahmen") for having listened to, read and given publicity to "inflammatory articles" from abroad.

In the end the death sentence was never carried out. Supported by "psychiatric assessments" and the advocacy of influential academics including Karl Vossler, Ernst Robert Curtius and Hans-Georg Gadamer, the death sentence was replaced with a five-year jail sentence on 14 September 1944. Ursula Goetze had been executed on 5 August 1943. By the time his sentence was commuted Krauss had spent twenty months awaiting execution, including a stretch in a death cell in Plötzensee Prison where he shared a cell with chemical engineer Hansheinrich Kummerow, another German resistance fighter. During his time in Plötzensee Werner Krauss was able to write, clandestinely, a satirical Roman à clef entitled "Die Passionen der halkyonischen Seele" ("The Passions of a Halcyon Soul"), with an air-force officer (Harro Schulze-Boysen) as its principal protagonist. The book was published after the war, in 1946, characterised as an anti-fascist novel: it was reissued in 1983.

Before the war ended, formally in May 1945, and having outlasted his death sentence, Krauss had another close brush with death. On 21 April 1945 he was among the inmates from the military prison at Torgau sent on a forced march to the east. In any event, the column of prisoners was intercepted by advancing US troops. With the help of a doctor, Krauss managed to have himself loaded onto a hospital train to Karlsbad, and from there he was taken to a US prisoner of war camp at Eger on the border with Czechoslovakia. He was released on 16 June 1945.

=== After the war ===
On his release Krauss made his way back to Marburg, where in 1945 or 1946 he finally received the professorship which the university had felt unable to confer on him during the Nazi years. In 1945 he was one of four co-founders of the influential but short-lived monthly publication, Die Wandlung. He also sat on the committee responsible for denazification of his fellow professors at Marburg. The next year, in 1947, he accepted an invitation to take a professorship in Romance Philology at the Philology-History department of the Philosophy faculty at Leipzig University, where according to one source he expected "a more consistent antifascism".

Post-war Germany to the west of its new frontier with Poland had been divided in 1945 into four military zones of occupation, and the relocation from Marburg to Leipzig involved a move from the US occupation zone to the Soviet occupation zone, a distinction which gained significance during the later 1940s as the Soviet zone became increasingly separated politically from the other three.

Der Sozialismus bleibt einzige Lösung, trotz seiner Diskreditierung durch eine Praxis, die manche Ansprüche erfüllt, aber den Anspruch, der der Mensch ist, geflissentlich überhört und verleumdet.

Werner Krauss, 1966

Socialism is still the only solution, although its theory has been discredited by a practice that meets some demands, but deliberately ignores and denies basic human aspirations.

Shortly after the war Krauss also joined the Communist Party. In a letter dated 19 February 1946 he was appointed the party's representative on the newly launched Consultative Regional Committee (Greater Hessen), intended by the occupiers as a precursor to the Landtag of Hesse (regional legislative assembly) which would accompany the re-establishment of a democratic political structure. However, on 15 May 1946 he resigned his seat on the committee in favour of Jo Mihaly.

The territory administered as the Soviet occupation zone was relaunched in October 1949 as the Soviet sponsored German Democratic Republic (East Germany), a one-party state governed by the Socialist Unity Party ("Sozialistische Einheitspartei Deutschlands" / SED) which had been created for the purpose in April 1946. Krauss switched his own party membership to the SED in 1947. In February 1948 Werner Krauss was one of four people identified as "intellectuals" and inducted into the new party's steering committee, precursor to its powerful Central Committee, of which he remained a member till 1951. The focus of his career nevertheless remained firmly in the academic world. He became a member of the Saxony Academy of Sciences ("Sächsische Akademie der Wissenschaften") in 1949, and in 1951 took a professorship with a teaching chair at the Humboldt University of Berlin.

His work concentrated increasingly on the French Enlightenment. In 1955, under the auspices of the German Academy of Sciences, he set up a working group on the history of the French and German Enlightenments, and research on these themes would be at the centre of his working life even after he moved permanently to Berlin in 1961, till his retirement in 1965.

== Awards and honours ==
- 1949 National Prize of the German Democratic Republic Class 3
- 1956 Patriotic Order of Merit in bronze
- 1959 Friedrich Engels Prize from the (East) German Academy of Sciences and Humanities
- 1965 Outstanding peoples' scholar
- 1970 Patriotic Order of Merit in silver
- 1975 Patriotic Order of Merit in gold
