= Fritz Thiel =

German resistance fighter, part of the Rote Kapelle (1916–1943)

- Fritz Thiel, about 1933
- Born: 17 August 1916; Polkwitz, Silesia, German Empire
- Died: 13 May 1943 (aged 26); Plötzensee Prison, Berlin, Nazi Germany
- Known for: Member of the Red Orchestra resistance group
- Spouse: Hannelore Hoffmann (m. 1942)
- Children: son Alexander

Fritz Thiel (17 August 1916 – 13 May 1943) was a German precision engineer and resistance fighter against the Nazi regime. He became part of a Berlin-based anti-fascist resistance group during World War II, that was later named the Red Orchestra ("Rote Kapelle") by the Abwehr. Thiel along with his wife Hannelore were most notable for printing stickers using a child's toy rubber stamp kit, that they used to protest The Soviet Paradise exhibition (German original title "Das Sowjet-Paradies") in May 1942 in Berlin, that was held by the German regime to justify the war with the Soviet Union. The group found the exhibition both egregious and horrific; one exhibited photograph showed a young woman and her children hanged side by side. Thiel was executed for his resistance action.

== Life ==
Thiel was born in Polkwitz, Silesia. After attending school in Bonn, he began an apprenticeship as a baker but later switched to a watchmaking career. In 1932, he joined the Young Communist League of Germany (KJVD). His later activities as a member of the Communist Party of Germany are not known.

In 1935, Thiel volunteered for the Luftwaffe and was sent to Berlin for training as a radio operator in 1936. As he was part of the communist youth group, he was detained by the Gestapo in 1936, in suspicion of High Treason but was released for lack of evidence. In 1939 he was drafted again and deployed as a radio operator in Poland. In 1940 he was released from the Wehrmacht at the request of his employer Zeiss-Ikon-Werke.

From 1937, he began attending the Heil'schen Abendschule Abendgymnasium ("Berliner Städtische Abendgymnasium für Erwachsene") (BAG) at Berlin W 50, Augsburger Straße 60 in Schöneberg, where he successfully prepared for the Abitur. He met Hannelore Hoffmann at the school. Afterwards, he was a guest lecturer in economics at the Berlin University. At the Abendgymnasium, he made friends with his fellow students Friedrich Rehmer, Otto Gollnow, Ursula Goetze and Eva Rittmeister. Under the guidance of Eva Rittmeister's husband, John Rittmeister, the students in turn became opponents of Hitler.

In January 1942, Thiel married his pregnant girlfriend Hannelore Hoffmann, and on 24 May 1942 their son Alexander was born. Hannelore Thiel was seventeen years old at the time. She took an occasional active part in resistance activities.

== Resistance ==
In January 1942, he came into contact with the anti-fascist group around Harro Schulze-Boysen that would be later called the Red Orchestra by the Abwehr. Thiel participated in the production and distribution of the programmatic pamphlet Die Sorge um Deutschlands Zukunft geht durch das Volk, supported Hans Coppi in his attempts to repair defective radios and to learn radio, received and passed on leaflets and writings.

== The Soviet Paradise exhibition ==
Adhesive stickers that were posted on top of The Soviet Paradise posters

In May 1942, Joseph Goebbels held a Nazi propaganda exhibition called The Soviet Paradise (German original title "Das Sowjet-Paradies") in Lustgarten, with the express purpose of justifying the invasion of the Soviet Union to the German people. Schulze-Boysen and members of the group organised a protest action against the propaganda exhibition. Thiel and his wife Hannelore printed stickers using a child's toy rubber stamp kit. During the night of 17 May 1942, on a campaign initiated by John Graudenz Schulze-Boysen, Marie Terwiel, Thiel and nineteen others, travelled across five Berlin neighbourhoods to paste the stickers over the original exhibition posters with the stickers. His heavily pregnant wife was involved in the preparation but did not stick them herself, which spared her the death penalty.

== Arrest ==
As a result of the wave of arrests that began after Schulze-Boysen's imprisonment, the couple was also arrested on 16 September 1942. Hannelore Thiel celebrated her 18th birthday in prison. In detention, Thiel was severely tortured psychologically and physically (among other things, he was exposed to ultraviolet radiation for days). His statements severely incriminated his friends, especially Ursula Goetze, Werner Krauss and John Rittmeister. He subsequently tried to take his own life because of this.

On 18 January 1943, Thiel was sentenced to death for "preparation of high treason" and "for favouring the enemy" by the 2nd Senate of the Reichskriegsgericht. He was executed in Plötzensee Prison on 13 May 1943. His wife Hannelore was sentenced to six years in prison at the same trial. Her son was born in prison, and died in a children's home.
