= Heinz Strelow =

German resistance fighter (1915–1943)

- Portrait of Heinz Strelow
- Born: 15 July 1915; Hamburg, German Empire
- Died: 13 May 1943 (aged 27); Plötzensee Prison, Berlin, Nazi Germany
- Occupation: Journalist
- Known for: Resistance fighter

Heinz Strelow (born 15 July 1915 in Hamburg, died 13 May 1943 in Plötzensee Prison) was a German journalist, soldier and resistance fighter against the Nazi regime.

== Life ==
Strelow grew up in Hamburg and attended the left-leaning co-educational Lichtwark School in the Winterhude ward. Strelow's mother was Meta Strelow née Dannat from Hamburg, who ran an arts and craft business there. His father was a journalist, who was killed during World War I. His father had been a communist, as was his mother. Strelow was influenced by a teacher while he was in 11th grade in school (aged 16), so he became a member of the banned Young Communist League of Germany (KJVD) in 1932. He began to resist against the Nazis in 1933. Strelow was betrayed by a former classmate and arrested by the Gestapo on 8 October 1935. He was taken into protective custody without trial in a concentration camp in Fuhlsbüttel for several weeks and only released on 23 November 1935. When Strelow was released he left school, and continued to support his mother, by working at her business. Strelow continued his resistance activity in the workers' youth movement and organized a Hamburg group that also had contacts with Klaus Bücking and Gustav Böhrnsen in Bremen. This brought Strelow into contact with the instructor of the northern section leadership of the Communist Party of Germany (KPD), Conrad Blenkle. In the spring of 1939, Strelow was conscripted into the Reich Labour Service. He was deployed to a construction company in the polish, town of Dabie, where he worked to repair destroyed bridges. While in Poland, Strelow witnessed the beginning of World War II. Strelow's mother, a war widow, intervened to request that Strelow be posted back in Hamburg and was successful. After he returned to Hamburg, Strelow continued his military service. In 1940, while in a holiday in Hamburg, Strelow married Liselotte Rüggen née Timm. At the same time, Strelow was stationed at the Altengrabow military training area, located between Potsdam and Magdeburg. In April 1941, Strelow was transferred to the Army Ammunition Inspection Office in Wannsee. While he was there, he was promoted to a non-commissioned officer. While he was in Berlin and on the recommendation of his mother who knew the Bontjes van Beek family, Strelow lived with the sculptor Jan Bontjes van Beek and his family. While there, he became friends with Bontjes van Beek's daughter, Cato Bontjes van Beek and eventually became her lover.

Cato had met Libertas Schulze-Boysen, wife of Harro Schulze-Boysen in her father's home in September 1941. At the time, Harro Schulze-Boysen was the leader of an anti-fascist resistance group, operating in Berlin. Through Cato, Strelow was introduced to the Schulze-Boysen couple. Cato had begun to resist the Nazi's before she met Strelow. While on her way to her father's ceramic studio, she noticed that the last carriage of the trains that stopped at her local S-Bahn station, contained French prisoners of war. Along with her friends, they began to provide supplies, like food, medicine, fruit, lighters, sewing kits to the prisoners. This solidified her resolve and when she met the Schulze-Boysen couple, it gave her a way to actively resist. In the autumn of 1941, Cato had rented two rooms from Libertas Schulze-Boysen, that were part of her very large apartment at 2 Waitzstrasse in Charlottenburg. Strelow rented one of them from Cato. Van Beek and Strelow became involved in writing and distributing leaflets and paphlets.

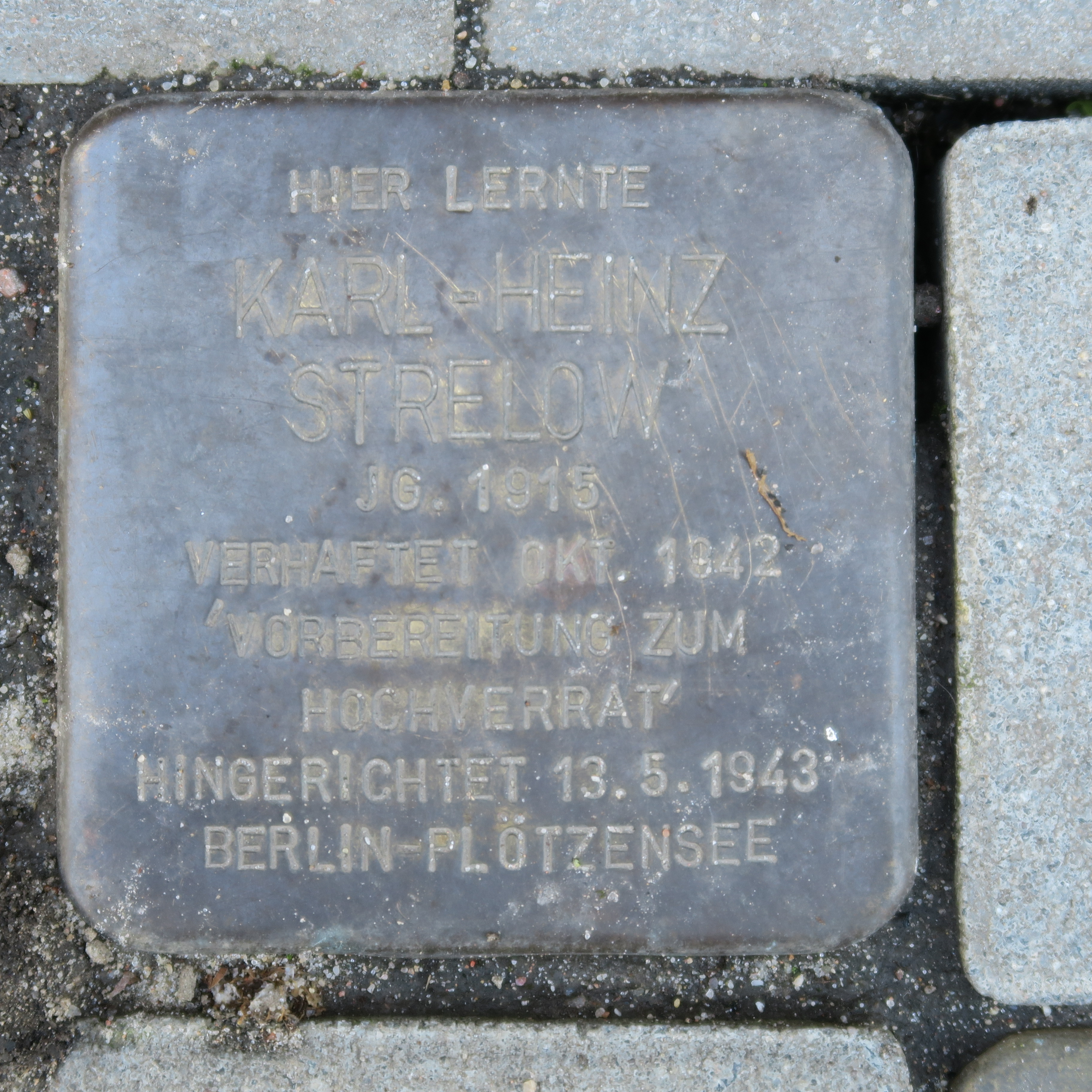
The Stolperstein ("Stumbling block") of Heinz Strelow, in the Grasweg 72 / Schule in Winterhude, Hamburg

Van Beek and Strelow revised and copyedited the six-page "Die Sorge Um Deutschlands Zukunft geht durch das Volk! leaflet that Schulze-Boysen and several other people in the group, had drafted it, in 15 February 1942, to produce a master copy, that was typed up by Maria Terwiel, on her typewriter for duplication in a mimeograph machine. One copy survives today. Strelow and Van Beek realised the danger they were in, and began to withdraw from the group and their resistance activities. However, by that time, the group members were already under observation by the Abwehr.

== Arrest ==
Strelow was arrested on 1 October 1942 by the Gestapo. On 18 January 1943, the 2nd Senate of the Reichskriegsgericht sentenced Strelow to the death penalty, for high treason and treasonable activity in favour of the Soviet Union. On 13 May 1943, Strelow was executed by guillotine at Plötzensee Prison along with twelve other members of the group, on the same day. Van Beek was arrested by Gestapo agents on 20 September 1942 in her father's pottery shop in Berlin. On 18 January 1943, she was found guilty at the Reichskriegsgericht military court of "abetting a conspiracy to commit high treason" and sentenced to death. A clemency appeal of the 22-year-old was personally denied by Adolf Hitler, though the court itself had suggested a reprieve. She was guillotined on 5 August 1943 at Plötzensee Prison in Berlin.

== Bibliography ==
- Marquardt, Wilhelm (2020). Gegen das Vergessen - Heinz Strelow Ein kurzes Leben in Briefen und anderen Schriften [Against Forgetting – Heinz Strelow A Short Life in Letters and Other Writings] (in German) (1st ed.). Norderstedt: Norderstedt BoD. ISBN 9783751951944. OCLC 1162624200.
- Vinke, Hermann (2003). Cato Bontjes van Beek : 'Ich habe nicht um mein Leben gebettelt' : ein Porträt [Cato Bontjes van Beek : 'I did not beg for my life' : a portrait] (in German). Zürich: Arche. ISBN 3-7160-2313-2. OCLC 606934856.
- Rosiejka, Gert (1986). Die Rote Kapelle "Landesverrat" als antifaschist. Widerstand (in German) (1st ed.). Hamburg: Ergebnisse Verlag. ISBN 3-925622-16-0. OCLC 497259004.
- Bontjes van Beek, Mietje (1998). Verbrennt diese Briefe! Kindheit und Jugend in der Hitlerzeit; 1922–1945; Fischerhude, Berlin, Allgäu [Burn these letters! Childhood and youth during the Hitler era] (in German). Fischerhude: Atelier im Bauernhaus Fischerhude. ISBN 9783881326070.
- Behrens, Katja (2007). 'Leben Sie wohl und glücklich' : Abschiedsbriefe aus fünf Jahrhunderten [Live well and happily] (Revised ed.). Darmstadt: Wissenschaftliche Buchgesellschaft. ISBN 9783534200979. OCLC 122954261.
- Wörmann, Heinrich-Wilhelm (1999). Widerstand in Charlottenburg [Resistance in Charlottenburg] (PDF). Widerstand 1933–1945 Berlin (in German). Vol. 5 (1st ed.). Berlin: Gedenkstätte Deutscher Widerstand.
