= Margarete Weisenborn =

German resistance fighter, writer and singer

Joy Weisenborn
- Joy Weisenborn in 1941
- Born: Margarete Schnabel; 5 September 1914; Essen, Germany
- Died: 2004; Heide
- Resting place: Lohe-Rickelshof/Schleswig-Holstein
- Occupation: Writer
- Movement: Member of the Red Orchestra ("Rote Kapelle")
- Spouse: Gunther Weisenborn

Margarete "Joy" Weisenborn (5 September 1914 in Essen, 2004 in Heide) was a German resistance fighter against Nazism as well as a writer and later a singer.

== Life ==
Weisenborn, born Margarethe Shnabel was the daughter Johannes Julius Schnabel who owned a small manufacturing factory in Wuppertal. As a child, she was completed her education in middle school and never attended high school. Weisenborns father died when she was in middle school, and the family were forced into poverty, leading her to rebel. She was sent to a boarding school for difficult children in the Netherlands in 1933, where she trained to be a school teacher.

After school Weisenborn went on a long journey through both France and England, finding work as an au pair, while she traveled and learning the language. While travelling, Weisenborn met Libertas Haas-Heye and exchanged details. From 1937 to 1938 Weisenborn worked as private tutor at Schwerin Castle in Mecklenburg.

On 25 January 1941, Weisenborn married Günther Weisenborn.

== Arrest ==
On 26 September 1942, Joy and Günther Weisenborn were arrested. Weisenborn was imprisoned in the women's remand prison at 79 Kantstraße in Charlottenburg from 28 January 1943 and released in April 1943. Günther Weisenborn was sentenced to death by the Reichskriegsgericht and sent to Luckau prison, until he was liberated by the Red Army in 1945.

== After World War II ==
From 1969, after the death of Günther Weisenborn, she lived in Agarone, Switzerland. In old age, when the steps and stairs “on the mountain” were making her life difficult, she decided to move to a shared apartment in Ascona and then finally moved again to Heide, just before her death, so as to be near her son Sebastian.

In July 2017, their son, Christian Weisenborn released a documentary film "Die guten Feinde" (The Good Enemies) that features his parents along with many members of the Rote Kapelle, that attempts to draw a portrait of the group.

== Bibliography ==
- Weisenborn, Günther; Weisenborn, Margrit; Raabe, Elisabeth (1984). Einmal laß mich traurig sein: Günther Weisenborn, Joy Weisenborn [d.i. Margrit Weisenborn]; Briefe, Lieder, Kassiber 1942-1943. [Hrsg. von Elisabeth Raabe unter Mitarb. von Joy Weisenborn] (in German). Zürich: Arche-Verl. ISBN 9783716020074.
- Weisenborn, Joy (2017). Liebe in Zeiten des Hochverrats: Tagebücher und Briefe aus dem Gefängnis 1942-1945 Liebe in Zeiten des Hochverrats: Tagebücher und Briefe aus dem Gefängnis 1942-1945 [Love in Times of High Treason: Diaries and Letters from Prison 1942-1945 Love in Times of High Treason: Diaries and Letters from Prison 1942-1945]. Munich: C.H.Beck.
