= Cato Bontjes van Beek =

German member of the Resistance against the Nazi regime (1920–1943)

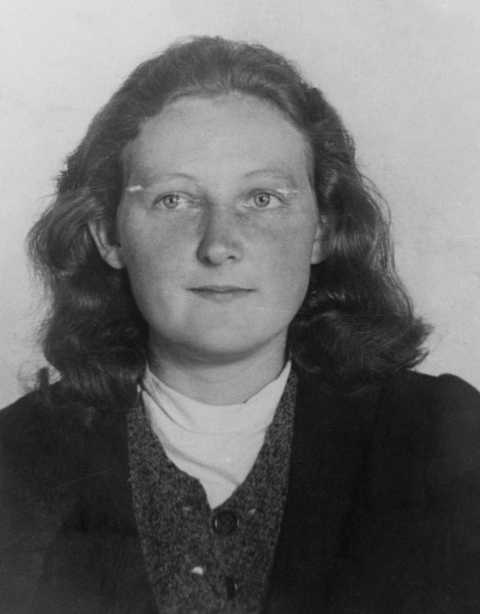
- Born: 14 November 1920; Bremen, Weimar Republic
- Died: 5 August 1943 (aged 22); Plötzensee Prison, Berlin, Nazi Germany
- Cause of death: Execution by guillotine
- Known for: Member of the Widerstand

Cato Bontjes van Beek (German: [ˈkaːto ˈbɔnti̯əs fan ˈbeːk]; 14 November 1920 – 5 August 1943) was a German member of the Resistance against the Nazi regime.

== Early years ==
Born in Bremen, Cato was the eldest of three children. She spent her childhood and youth in the nearby Fischerhude artists' colony around her uncle Otto Modersohn. Her parents, the Dutch-born potter Jan Bontjes van Beek (1899–1969) and dancer and painter Olga Bontjes van Beek (née Breling; 1896–1995) offered their children considerable personal freedom while growing up. From 1929, Cato stayed abroad to attend the German school in Amsterdam, and in 1937, she spent time in Winchcombe, Gloucestershire, as an au pair.

Unlike many others, Cato did not join the League of German Girls (Bund Deutscher Mädel, BDM) youth organisation. Through her younger brother, Tim (1923–2013), she met Luftwaffe Sergeant Helmut Schmidt, the future Chancellor of Germany, who, from 1937, was stationed in Bremen-Vegesack for his military service and during this time had an intense friendship with the Bontjes van Beek family. However, Schmidt eventually broke off this friendship when he began an officers' training in order to join the Oberkommando der Luftwaffe in Berlin.

Beginning in 1940, Cato and her younger sister, Mietje, lived with their father in Berlin, where he had already moved in 1933 in the hopes of spreading his artistic work. They met friends at their father's house who opposed the Nazi regime. Cato, though, struggled to choose a profession and attempted to become a pilot. This even included joining the National Socialist Flyers Corps to learn gliding. However, Cato eventually decided to learn her father's craft.

In 1940, Cato experienced the deportation of a Jewish family who lived in the same house. In a letter to her aunt, she then expressed her worries about "something terrible" to come. Both sisters saw the wrong that the Nazis inflicted upon others, were affected by it, and tried to help. Beginning in September 1940, this included giving humanitarian aid to French prisoners of war. Both Cato and Mietje would hand out bread or exchange letters with them while riding the Berlin S-Bahn.

== Resistance activities ==
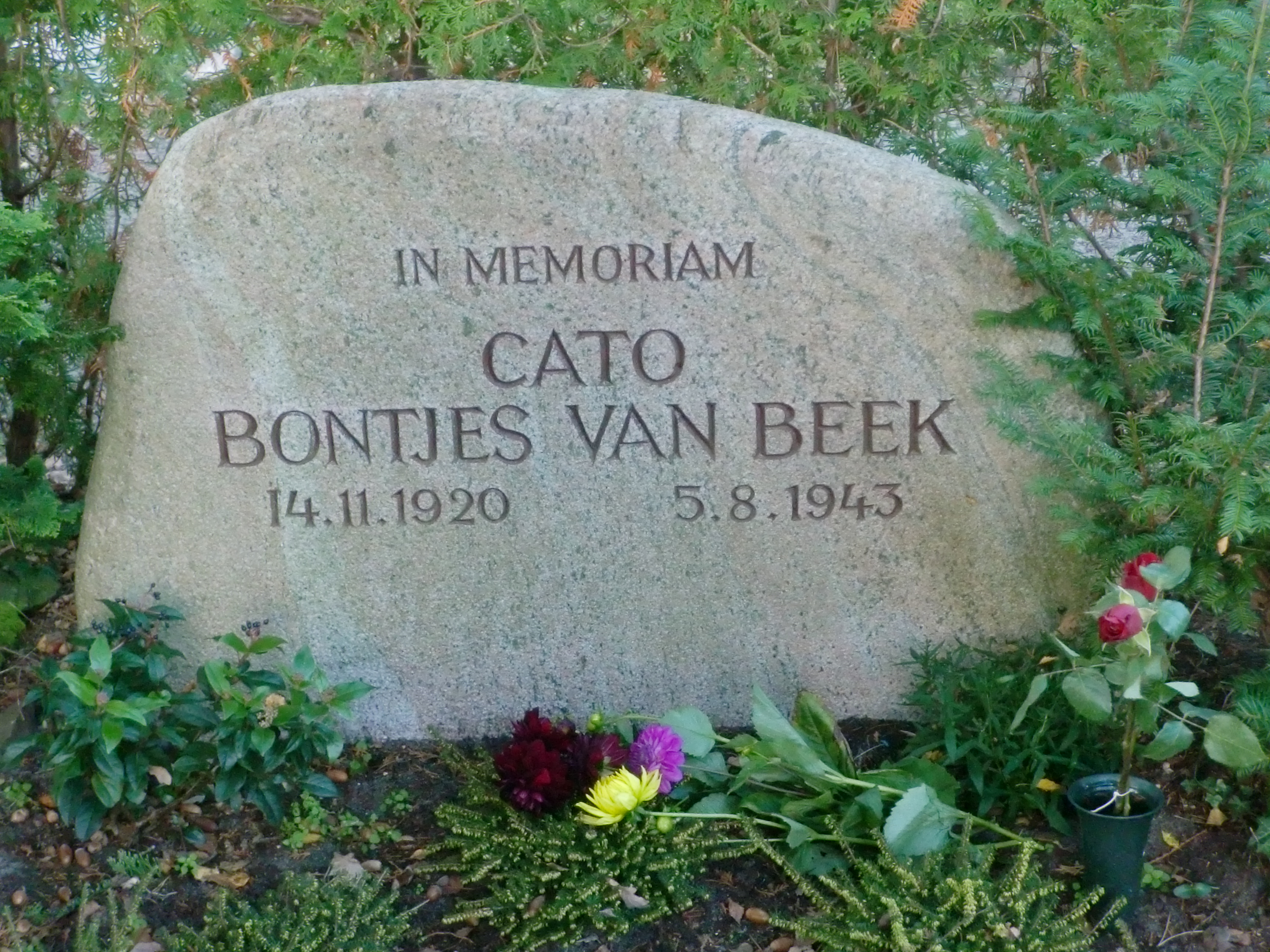
Cato Bontjes van Beek memorial, Fischerhude cemetery

Van Beek's active work against the Nazis began in the Red Orchestra resistance organization after she had gotten to know Libertas Schulze-Boysen in autumn 1941. Together with her friend, the author Heinz Strelow, she distributed illegal writings and leaflets which sought to arouse readers to the struggle and resistance against the Nazi regime.

== Arrest ==
In the course of the suppression of the resistance group, van Beek was arrested by Gestapo agents on 20 September 1942 in her father's pottery shop in Berlin. On 18 January 1943, she was found guilty at the Reichskriegsgericht military court of "abetting a conspiracy to commit high treason" and sentenced to death. A clemency appeal of the 22-year-old was personally denied by Adolf Hitler, though the court itself had suggested a reprieve. She was guillotined on 5 August 1943 at Plötzensee Prison in Berlin, together with 19-year-old Liane Berkowitz, who had given birth to a daughter in April. Her body was released to the institute of anatomy of Hermann Stieve on the same evening. Her final resting place is unknown.

Cato's younger sister, Mietje, managed to escape Nazi persecution and lived in Fischerhude until her death in 2012. Cato's mother's efforts to have her daughter's death sentence declared invalid remained unsuccessful for decades. The conviction was only reversed in 1999, four years after Cato's mother's death.

== Honours ==
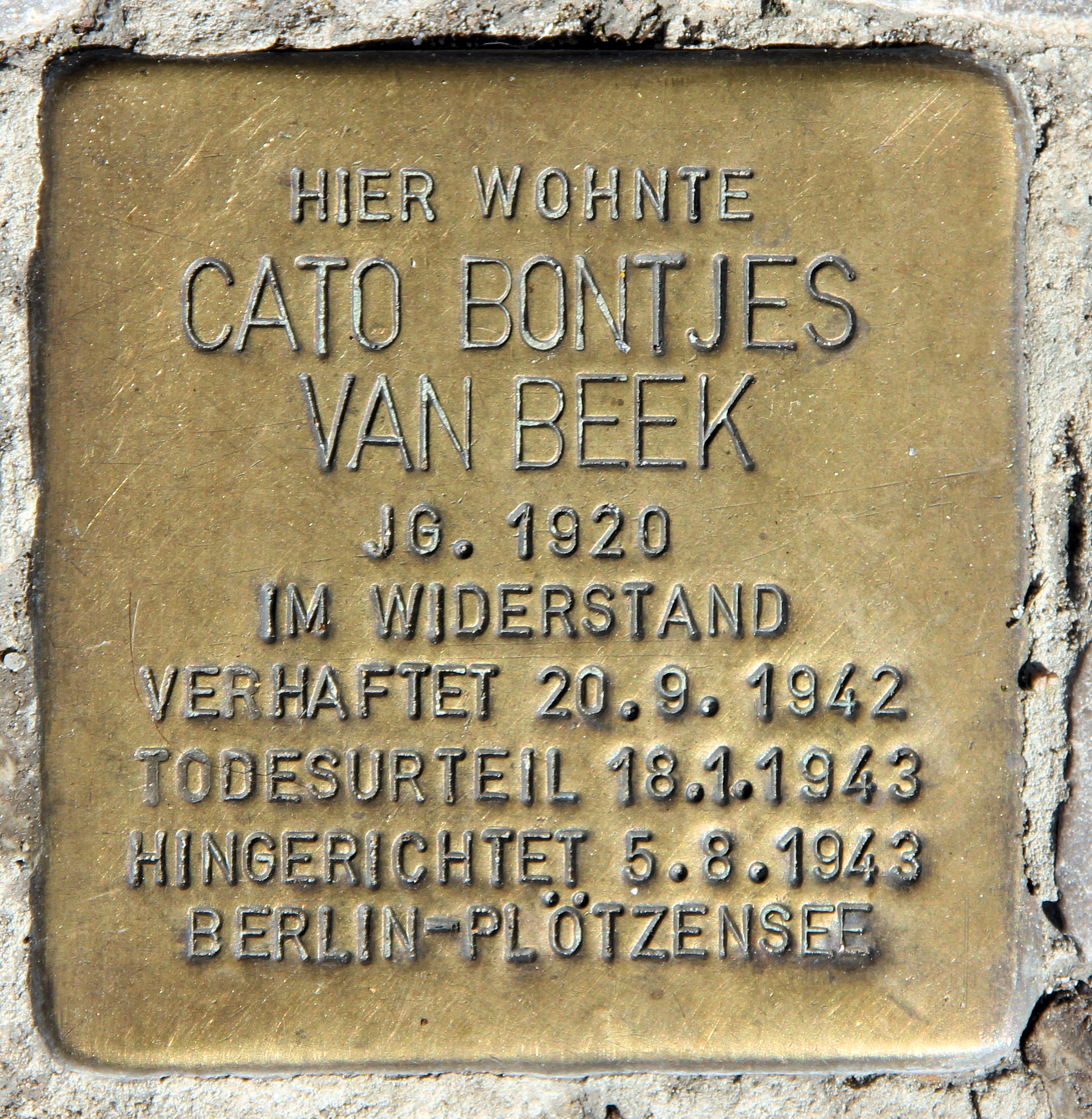
Stolperstein memorial in front of last address Kaiserdamm No. 22, Berlin-Westend

A gymnasium secondary school in Achim, a town near Bremen, has since 1991 borne the name Cato Bontjes van Beek-Gymnasium. A street in nearby Fischerhude also bears her name, and an explanatory notice. Both these places are in the Verden district. Further streets and public squares are named after her in Bremen, Leipzig, and Meldorf.
