= Otto Ludwig Haas-Heye =

- Born: 16 December 1879; Heidelberg
- Died: 9 June 1959 (aged 79)
- Spouse: Viktoria Ada Astrid Agnes (1909–1921)
- Children: Johannes; Ottora; Libertas
- Parents: Hermann Haas (father); Hermanna Helene Heye (mother)

Otto Ludwig Haas-Heye (16 December 1879 – 9 June 1959) was a German fashion designer, professor at the Unterrichtsanstalt des Kunstgewerbemuseums Berlin and owner of the publishing company Graphik-Verlag. Haas-Heye headed the fashion department of the Kunstgewerbemuseum in Prinz-Albrecht-Straße 8. He was editor at the Graphische Modeblätter.

== Biography ==
Otto Ludwig Haas-Heye was born in Heidelberg on 16 December 1879 to Prof. Hermann Haas (1852–1902) (Note: Newspaper publisher of the Münchner Zeitung and the Mannheimer Zeitung. He is regarded as the co-founder of German liberalism and was acquainted with Paul Lindau and Moritz von Egidy (Vater), the fathers of liberalism in southern Germany.) and Hermanna Helene Heye (1857–1942). After his parents divorced, Haas-Heye moved with his mother to her birthplace Bremen in 1889. He grew up in a Hanseatic patrician atmosphere, attendeding the Gymnasium at first, later the Real-Gymnasium and finally a commercial school. From 1895 to 1899 he studied painting at the Kunstakademie Düsseldorf. After a year of volunteering at the Schwere Reiter Regiment in Munich, Haas-Heye continued this artistic training at the Académie Julian in 1901–1902.

Haas-Heye's father died in 1902, leaving him with a considerable fortune. He moved to Munich that same year, to Rome in 1904, to Paris in 1905 and then continued to travel through Turkey, Egypt, Greece and Albania in 1906. Haas-Heye studied at the Berlin University of the Arts under Arthur Kampf in 1907–1908.

On 12 May 1909, Haas-Heye married Viktoria Ada Astrid Agnes, Countess of Eulenburg, the youngest daughter of Philipp, Prince of Eulenburg, and a godchild of German Empress Augusta Victoria. This gave him access to European aristocracy. The couple went to Great Britain in 1910 and from 1912 to 1914 they lived in London and Paris. Together they had three children: Johannes, journalist and diplomat, Ottora Maria, (Note: 1910–2001; wife of the Swedish ambassador Carl Douglas and mother of Princess Elisabeth, Duchess in Bavaria, Gustaf Douglas and Rosita Spencer-Churchill, Duchess of Marlborough) and Libertas. During his stay in France, Haas-Heye became acquainted with many couturiers, including Paul Poiret. The outbreak of World War I forced him to return to Germany in 1914.

=== Zeit-Echo ===
On 22 April 1914, Haas-Heye took over Graphik-Verlag in Munich after selling his shares in the Münchner Zeitung and the Mannheimer Zeitung, cofounded by his father. Haas-Heye moved the publishing house to Max Liebermann's townhouse in Berlin, becoming editor for Zeit-Echo, ein Kriegstagebuch der Künstler ("Zeit-Echo, an artist's wartime diary", containing prose, poetry, reviews and graphic arts) until December 1916. He worked under editor-in-chief Friedrich Markus Huebner and art director Otto Th. W. Stein in 1914, followed by editor-in-chief Hans Siemsen in 1915. Ludwig Rubiner took over as editor in 1917.

=== Fashion career ===
Haas-Heye also founded a fashion house in 1914. It was housed in the Hatzfeld Palace on Wilhelmplatz in Berlin. Out of protest against the war, he named it "Alfred-Marie" after a longtime friend in Paris. Haas-Heye was its artistic director until 1916. Through hand-colored prints by Annie Offterdinger (1894–1987) published by Graphik-Verlag, Haas-Heye made his designs accessible to the public.

During World War I, haute couture from Berlin was regarded as a trend-setting model for German fashion. The younger ladies of the distinguished society were particularly impressed by Haas-Heye's creations. The ladies of the aristocracy, who still held the necessary financial resources, as well as celebrities, now turned to Berlin fashion houses like Gerson, Manheimer, and Alfred-Marie.

Haas-Heye was conscripted in April 1916, but was allowed to leave in August, probably due to his father-in-law's relations, through which he could have an audience with Helmuth von Moltke the Younger, Chief of the German General Staff. Later that year, he assisted Hermann Muthesius in setting up the Deutscher Werkbund exhibition in Basel, where he organized a large fashion show, held in 1917 on a self-made stage. He lived in Switzerland until 1919, designing costumes for mime and balls.

In 1920, Bruno Paul appointed Haas-Heye as teacher at the Unterrichtsanstalt des Kunstgewerbemuseums Berlin, where he founded and the fashion and costume classes, subsequently receiving the title of professor in 1921. From then on, he devoted himself to costume design and stage decoration. He was involved in numerous stage plays, mimes and ballets in the following years, such as the stage of the Berlin State Opera Unter den Linden in 1921. From 1926 to 1929 he was a fashion consultant in Paris. Haas-Heye founded the Tracht und Modeschule in 1931, expanding it in 1932 to the Zürcher Kunst- und Modeschule.

With the rise of Nazism, Haas-Heye lived in Switzerland until 1936. He moved back to Berlin—staying mostly with his children Johannes and Libertas—until January 1938, when he travelled via the Netherlands to London. There he taught at a school named after Albert Reimann, starting in 1939 at the Royal School of Needlework. From 1940 and 1941 he was based on the Isle of Man and founded a school of good taste.

In 1953, he went on a lecture tour through the Federal Republic of Germany, where he was celebrated as a fashion czar from the imperial period and the Weimar Republic. In 1958, he returned to Germany and settled down in Mannheim. He had plans for a Mannheim fashion museum, but on 9 June 1959 he died after a traffic accident.
