= Friedrich Rehmer =

German resistance fighter (1921–1943)

Friedrich Rehmer (2 June 1921 in Berlin – 13 May 1943 in Plötzensee Prison) was a German factory worker and resistance fighter against the Nazi regime. While attending an evening school in Schöneberg, Rehmer met a group of friends that included Ursula Goetze, Otto Gollnow, Hannelore Thiel, Liane Berkowitz, John Rittmeister and Werner Krauss. In December 1941, he became part of an anti-fascist network after meeting Harro Schulze-Boysen through Wolfgang Rittmeister, brother to John Rittmeister. The network was later called the Red Orchestra ("Rote Kapelle") by the Abwehr. Rehmer was executed in 1943.

== Life ==
Rehmer grew up in Neukölln area of Berlin to a working-class family. After school, he did an apprenticeship as a locksmith and worked as an adjuster. At the end of the 1930s, he still took part in excursions and activities of the now-banned Bündische Jugend.

From 1938 to 1940, he successfully attended the Heil'schen Abendschule at Berlin W 50, Augsburger Straße 60 in Schöneberg to prepare for the Abitur and where he met Liane Berkowitz. Afterwards, he was employed there as a substitute teacher because of his outstanding knowledge of geography and history. From joint schoolwork with his fellow pupil Eva Rittmeister, an oppositional discussion circle developed under the guidance of her husband, the psychoanalyst John Rittmeister, to which Rehmer's fiancée Liane Berkowitz also belonged.

On 5 June 1941, Rehmer was conscripted into the German army. and severely wounded on the Eastern Front with a leg injury. He was therefore unable to take part in his friends' note-taking campaign against the propaganda exhibition "The Soviet Paradise". In connection with the wave of arrests that followed the arrest of Harro Schulze-Boysen, he was arrested in November 1942 in the Britz military hospital and sentenced to death as a member of the Red Orchestra organisation by the 2nd senate of the Reichskriegsgericht on 18 January 1943 and executed on the 13 May 1943 in Plötzensee Prison. Rehmer was heavily incriminated by witness statements accusing him of Wehrkraftzersetzung (sedition) in the military hospital with statements such as "The war is lost" and "Germans will still have to be ashamed of the crimes in the Soviet Union centuries from now".

His fiancée Liane Berkowitz gave birth to their daughter Irina in prison. The child died in October 1943 in a children's home in Eberswalde under unexplained circumstances.
