= Ursula Goetze =

German student and resistance fighter (1916–1943)

- Ursula Goetze
- Born: 29 March 1916; Berlin, Germany
- Died: 5 August 1943 (aged 27); Berlin, Germany
- Occupation: Anti-Nazi campaigner
- Known for: Execution at Plötzensee
- Parent(s): Otto & Margarete Goetze

Ursula Goetze (29 March 1916 – 5 August 1943) was a Berlin student and resistance fighter, who participated in political opposition to the Nazi government in Germany. In May 1942, following involvement in a leafleting campaign, she was arrested and, some time later, sentenced to death. She died by decapitation with a guillotine.

== Life ==
=== Provenance and early years ===
Ursula Goetze was her parents' third recorded child, born into a middle-class family. Her father, Otto Goetze, ran a wallpaper factory. Later, her parents became hoteliers when Otto and Margarete Goetze took over the "Thüringer Hof" (hotel) in Berlin's Hedemannstraße (Hedemann Street). Between 1922 and 1933 Ursula attended school in the Berlin quarters of Wilmersdorf and Neukölln. Unlike many fifteen year old schoolchildren, Goetze followed the political developments of the early 1930s with keen interest. Helped by like minded school friends and by her elder brother, Eberhard, she made contact with the Young Communists in Neukölln, and during 1932 was participating in anti-Nazi activities. She was at this stage particularly energised by the adverse social consequences of the Great Depression.

=== Régime change ===
The Nazis took power in January 1933 and lost little time in converting the German state into a one-party dictatorship. Party political activity (unless in support of the Nazi party) became illegal. By this time she had already been arrested and briefly detained by the police in connection with political leafleting: she now became more secretive about her political activities. During 1933, and on till March 1935, she attended a commercially focused school (Handelsschule) in Neukölln. During this time she was also in touch with anti-fascist groups, providing welfare support to persecuted Jewish citizens and other families of imprisoned opponents to the Nazi regime. She took several foreign holidays, covering Czechoslovakia, France, Austria and Italy, and used these as opportunities to smuggle "anti-fascist reading matter" into Germany on the way home.

=== Activism ===
In 1935, shortly before she was due to complete her studies, Goetze dropped out of school, and for several years took a succession of typing and secretarial jobs.

As she moved out of her teens her political activity became more focused. She collected money to support victims of political persecution. In 1937 she visited the World Fair in Paris, the city which by this time had become the de facto headquarters of the German Communist Party in exile. She was also becoming part of a network of like minded government opponents in Berlin.

In 1938 Goetze resumed the formal education that she had abandoned in 1935, attending evening classes at the "Heilsche Abendgymnasium" a private college in Schöneberg, in order to prepare for the "Abitur" (school finals). Her longer term goal was to become a school teacher which would, she felt, provide a practical basis for opposition to the Nazi régime. At the college she formed a particularly close friendship with the fellow activist Eva Rittmeister (born Eva Knieper). Other members of their circle included Eva's husband John, Fritz Thiel and Friedrich Rehmer. As more and more victims of race based and political persecution fled into exile, Goetze found that she also had an increasing range of international contacts. During the late summer of 1939, a few weeks before war resumed, she was visiting Jewish friends in London and made contact with members of the British Labour Party. By this time there was a widespread acceptance that war was coming, even if the precise timetable of its outbreak remained unclear. Goetze nevertheless resisted imprecations to stay in England, returning to Germany in order to pursue her work against the Hitler government.

=== War and resistance ===
The German Invasion of Poland at the start of September 1939 triggered the declaration of World War II, which ushered in fresh challenges for government opponents in Berlin. Goetze eventually passed her Abitur (school finals) which opened the way for her to embark on a course at Berlin University, where she enrolled on 9 April 1940 to study Philology (English and French) at the Deutsche Hochschule für Politik (as it was then known). It was at about this time that her parents took over the management of the "Thüringer Hof" (hotel), moving out of the four room apartment which they had till this point shared with their children.

Ursula stayed on in the former family home at Hornstraße 3 (3 Horn Street) in Berlin-Kreuzberg, which was becoming a meeting point where friends gathered together to listen illicitly to "enemy radio propaganda programmes": these became important as sources of information. Her fluency in French also meant she was able to translate anti-fascist leaflets into that language.

Unsurprisingly in view of her activities and networks, Goetze soon came into contact with the resistance activists Harro Schulze-Boysen and Arvid Harnack, and their circle. Her apartment was used for a number of secret meetings. In the language of the Gestapo her involvement with the Schulze-Boysen/Harnack group would have made Goetze a member of the so-called Red Orchestra (Rote Kapelle). A particular friend was Werner Krauss, an academic who had been obliged to relocate from Marburg to Berlin. The two of them shared a flair for foreign languages and tried, apparently without much success, to set up resistance groups among the French forced labourers in Berlin.

Permanent exhibition: The Nazi Paradise - war, hunger, lies, Gestapo - how much longer?

In defiance of the urgings their more cautious fellow activists, Fritz Thiele and Harro Schulze-Boysen, on 17 May 1942, Goetze and Krauss, undertook a "sticker campaign" targeting a high-profile exhibition being held in the Lustgarten park in May/June 1942 which carried the ironic title "The Soviet Paradise". Echoing the exhibition's title, their stickers carried the message: "Permanent exhibition – The Nazi Paradise – War, Hunger, Lies, Gestapo - How much longer?"

It is not clear how much the Gestapo had been aware of Goetze's resistance activities up to this point, but if it had not happened before, by the end of August 1942 she and Krauss had been identified as members of the "Red Orchestra". Goetze was arrested in Küstrin on 15 October 1942. Krauss was probably arrested only in November 1942. They both faced the court on 18 January 1943 and were sentenced to death.

In prison during the final months of her life, Goetze developed strong feelings of guilt, believing she had said more than was necessary and thereby unnecessarily incriminating Werner Krauss, who had had strong doubts about the sticker campaign. In order to save her friend, she tried to take full responsibility onto her own shoulders, which meant disputing statements extracted from Fritz Thiel (who had already been executed). Thiel, under torture, had strongly implicated both Goetze and Krauss. In the end, the death sentence handed out to Krauss was replaced, on 14 September 1944, by a five-year prison sentence.

Ursula Goetze was one of sixteen people executed during a 45-minute period at the Plötzensee prison during the early evening of 5 August 1943.
