= John Rittmeister =

German psychiatrist and resistance fighter (1898–1943)

John Friedrich Karl Rittmeister
- John Rittmeister campaigned for people who were persecuted by the Nazi regime.
- Born: 21 August 1898; Hamburg, German Empire
- Died: 13 May 1943 (aged 44)
- Scientific career
- Fields: neurology, psychoanalysis

John Friedrich Karl Rittmeister (21 August 1898–13 May 1943), often also abbreviated John F. Rittmeister, was a German neurologist, psychoanalyst and resistance fighter against Nazism. Rittmeister was a humanist and socialist who based his opposition to the Nazi state on moral grounds. He was known as a communist member of the anti-fascist resistance group that was later called the Red Orchestra by the Abwehr.

== Life ==
John Rittmeister was born in Hamburg to a Hanseatic merchant family that had lived in Hamburg for generations and included politicians and artists. He was the eldest of three children. and had a younger brother called Wolfgang. As a child, he attended the Gelehrtenschule des Johanneums in Hamburg where he became interested in the philosophers Giordano Bruno and René Descartes. To fight against a perceived inner weakness, Rittmeister enlisted in the Germany army in 1917. He fought in last two years of World War I on the French Champagne and Italian high mountain fronts as a telephone operator and by the end of the war he had become a non-commissioned officer. Rittmeister like most men after the Great War was thankful that he had survived although some of his friends were killed. After returning from war he disappointed his family, particularly his father when he decided to not take up the trading house that was family business. Instead he decided to study medicine starting in 1918 at the universities of Göttingen, Kiel, Hamburg and Munich. In 1922, Rittmeister became interested in psychotherapy through the work of the neurologist and psychoanalyst Hans von Hattingberg after he sought psychological help. At this time, he started to study the work of Carl Jung, Mikhail Bakunin and Karl Marx. Rittmeister specialised in Neurology under Max Nonne at the newly founded University of Hamburg. After three years training between 1926 and 1929 at the Psychiatry clinic Schön Klinik Hamburg Eilbek in Munich, Rittmeister was promoted to a physician with a thesis titled: Ueber einen fall von staphylococcen myelitis.

In 1939, after returning to Germany, Rittmeister married Eva Rittmeister née Knieper, who was a pediatric nurse and fifteen years younger than him. Rittmeister considered her "life-affirming", who often enriched his depressed tendencies.

== Career ==
Rittmeister continued his education by studying in Paris and London. In England he studied at Toynbee Hall in Whitechapel and was introduced to the settlement movement. In 1928, Rittmeister's moved to Zurich, Switzerland and after two years he obtained a voluntary position to work at the Burghölzli Institute in Switzerland, staying for three years between 1929 and 1931. From 1931 to 1935, Rittmeister worked as an assistant physician at the Polyclinic for Nervous Diseases at the University of Zurich, founded by the noted neuropathologist Constantin von Monakow. In 1935, Rittmeister began studying under the Swiss psychiatrist Gustav Bally. During the early period of his work at the Polyclinic, Rittmeister was tutored by the neuroanatomist and psychiatrist Auguste Forel at his home in Prangins. Through the efforts of Storch, Rittmeister found a position as a physician at the Münsingen cantonal sanatorium that was directed by the Swiss psychiatrist Max Müller. Müller had sought Rittmeister in November 1936 to conduct a joint study on schizophrenia with Alfred Storch that was to include an extensive catamnestic survey of the former patients of the Tübingen Psychiatric Clinic at the University of Tübingen. Rittmeister developed a professional relationship with Storch that eventually blossomed into strong friendship. In 1937, Rittmeister against the advice of friends, returned to Germany after being expelled from Switzerland. During the time, he was there he became a convinced Marxist after attending communist meetings and becoming involved in communist activities that included a study trip to the Soviet Union. According to an entry in his prison diary on 24 January 1943, to both find a wife and seek a professional position that was aligned with his experience. In 1938, he was appointed as a senior physician at the Berlin Psychoanalytic Institute at the Berlin Institute of Psychotherapeutic Research and Psychotherapy. The institute was run by Professor Matthias Göring, a relative of Reichsmarschall Hermann Göring. In 1941, Rittmeister was appointed the director of the clinic.

== Analysis ==
Like many European psychoanalysts at the time, Rittmeister was on the social and political left and was much closer than his peers to the iconoclastic bent within psychoanalysis that had begun with Freud himself.

In the early 1930s, Rittmeister, in contrast to his peers, accused Carl Jung of "archetypal mysticism" and seeing in Jung's "ahistorical image-collectivism" the symptoms of the frightened and confused bourgeois response to the massive social change of the 20th Century. In Rittmeister's critique of Jung, he classified Jung as a "crypto-fascist" in an approach that echoed German Marxist philosopher Ernst Bloch similar conclusion to German psychiatrist Hans Prinzhorn and the German philosopher Ludwig Klages approach. Instead of turning to a kind of fuzzy romanticism as many as his peers did, Rittmeister began to construct a critique of modern civilisation in the Freudian manner that avoided the emotionalism, mysticism, and relativism that he found in his analysis of Jung. For Rittmeister, he understood that Jung taught the virtues of introversion, an immersion of the self to the exclusion of others, while Freud taught humanity in the ecumenical virtues of love.

== Red Orchestra ==
Surviving example of the small adhesive leaflets

Rittmeister hosted a small ideological, humanist and political discussion group that included his wife's friends like the mechanic Fritz Thiel, the student Ursula Goetze and a soldier Friedrich Rehmer after he moved to Germany. It was through his wife, Eva Knieper who attended the Heil'schen Abendschule Abendgymnasium ("Berliner Städtische Abendgymnasium für Erwachsene") (BAG) at Berlin W 50, Augsburger Straße 60 in Schöneberg that their meetings eventually intersected with people who were members of the anti-fascist resistance group that was led by Harro Schulze-Boysen in Christmas 1941. Rittmeister did not share the activist politics of the people around Schulze-Boysen, nor did he confess knowledge of the hard espionage activities that the group had undertaken in 1941 and 1942. However, Rittmeister did take part in the resistance activities of the group, becoming involved in leafleting. Rittmeister had a longing for a "new humanism", so resistance was seen by him as a path that led away from the what he saw as the crass and heartless culture of the west.

The group started to produce leaflets that were signed with AGIS in reference to the Spartan King Agis IV. The name of the newspaper Agis was originally the idea of Rittmeister. These had titles like The becoming of the Nazi movement, Call for opposition, Freedom and violence and Appeal to All Callings and Organisations to resist the government.

On the 17/18 May 1942, Rittmeister took part in the most dangerous resistance action on the occasion of The Soviet Paradise exhibition. During the night, Rittmeister along with nineteen other people, mostly folk who were his friends travelled across five Berlin neighbourhoods to paste handbills over the original exhibition posters with the message:

Permanent Exhibition
The Nazi Paradise
War, Hunger, Lies, Gestapo
How much longer?

== Arrest ==
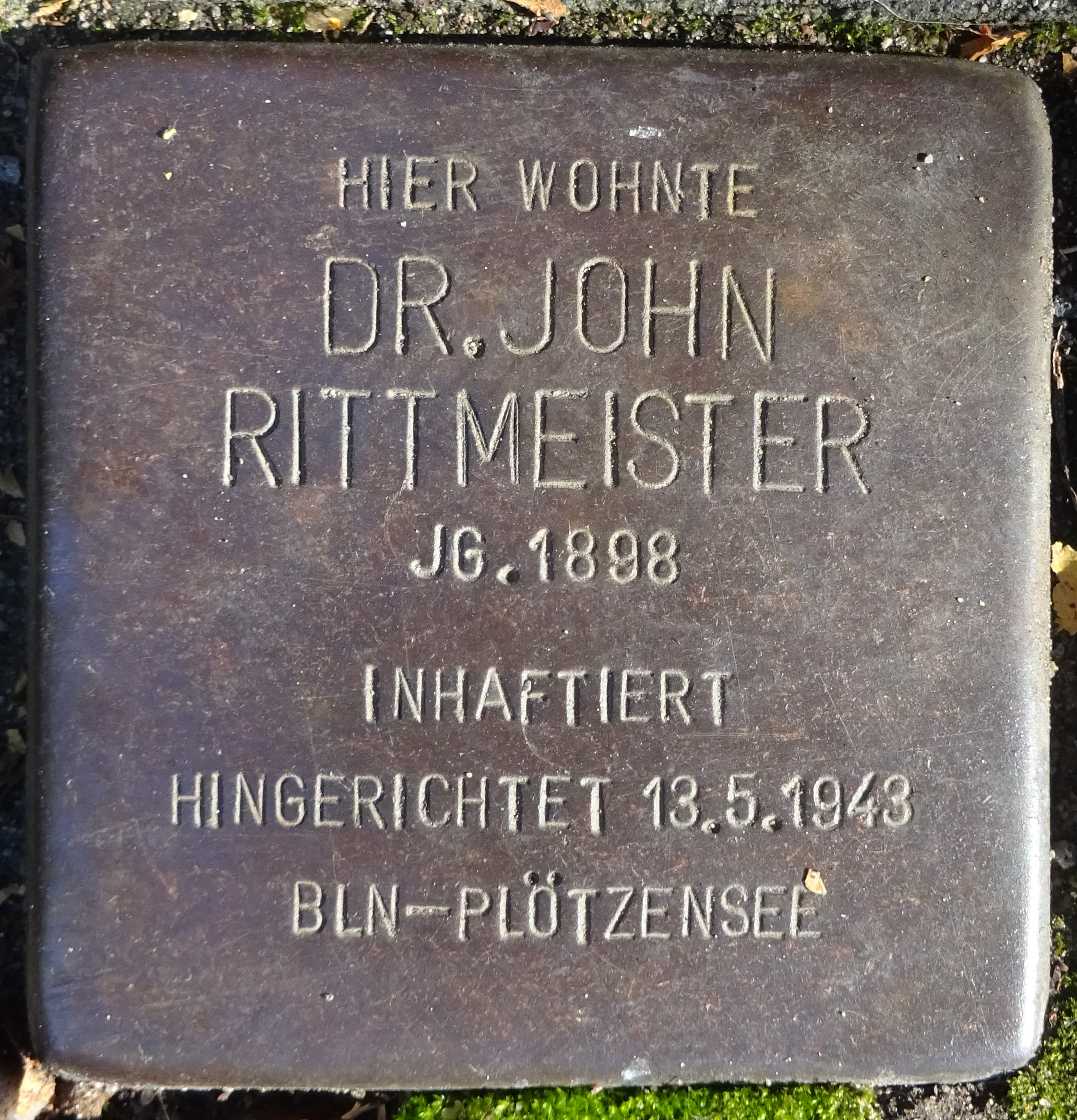
A Stolperstein or stumbling block memorial to Rittmeister that sits in front of the house Agnesstraße 30 in Winterhude

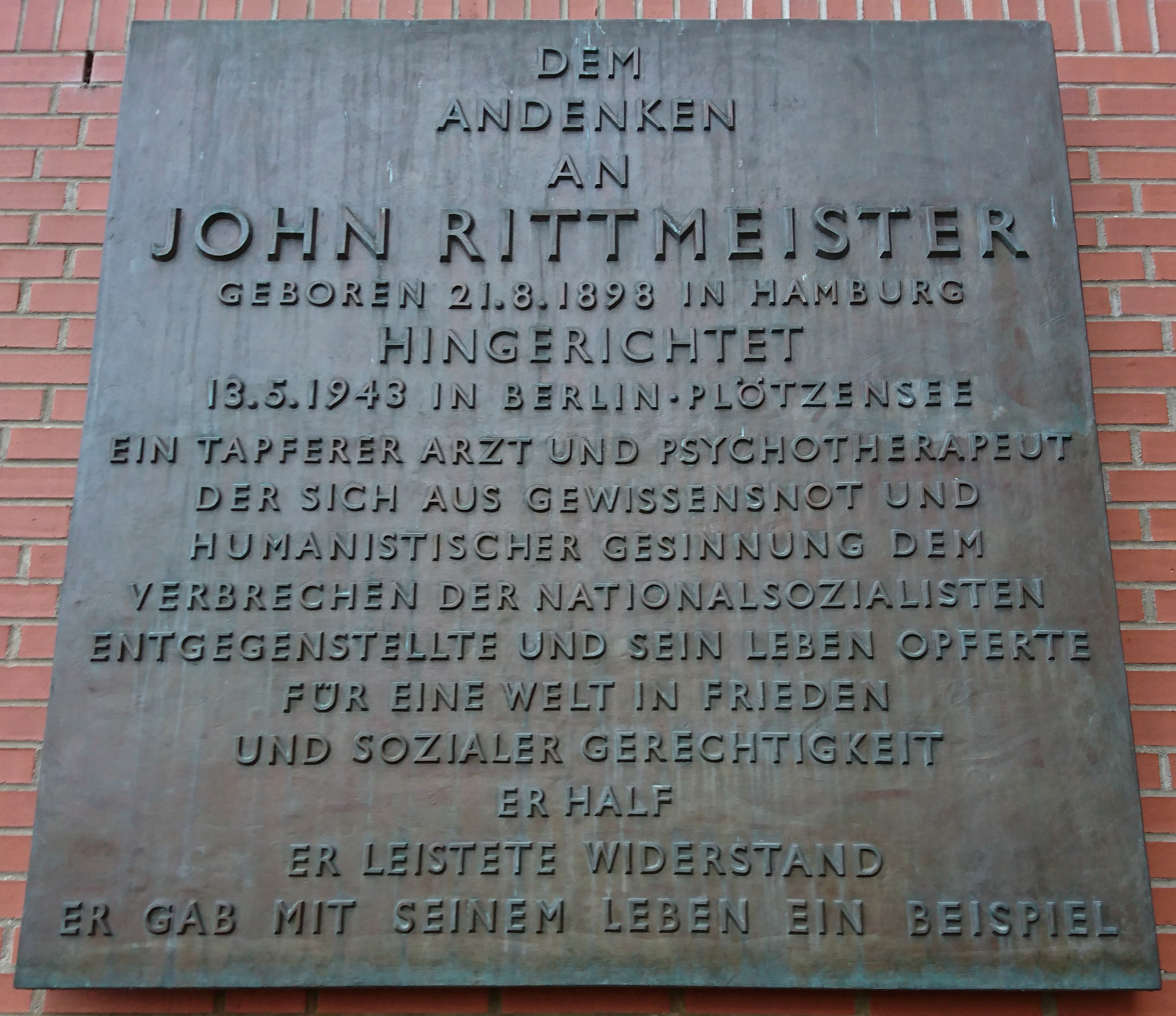
Memorial plaque for John Rittmeister on the facade of House 5 of the Asklepios Klinik Nord, location Ochsenzoll in Langenhorn

On 26 September 1942, Rittmeister was arrested by the Gestapo along with his wife Eva. On 12 February 1943, the 2nd Senate of the German military court, the Reichskriegsgericht sentenced him to death "for preparing for high treason and favouring the enemy". For his execution, he was offered the dubious choice of being guillotined instead of hanging. Rittmeister was executed on 13 May 1943 by the guillotine in Plötzensee Prison.

== Working Group ==
In 1993, a working group was created in the Institut for Psychotherapy in Berlin at the project group of the DPG-AG to celebrate and honour the life of John Rittmeister. Two lectures are conducted yearly, one private to the institute and one public as well as a picture as slide, presentation event.

== Papers ==
- Rittmeister, John F. (1968). "Die psychotherapeutische Aufgabe und der neue Humanismus". Psyche: Zeitschrift für Psychoanalyse und ihre Anwendungen (in German). 22 (12): 934–953. ISSN 0033-2623.
- Rittmeister, J. F. (1982). "Voraussetzungen und Konsequenzen der Jungschen Archetypenlehre" [Presuppositions and consequences of Jung's theory of archetypes]. Psyche: Zeitschrift für Psychoanalyse und ihre Anwendungen (in German). 36 (11): 1032–1044.
- Rittmeister, J.; Storch, A. (1969). "Die mystische Krise des jungen Descartes". Zeitschrift für Psychosomatische Medizin und Psychoanalyse (in German). 15 (3): 206–224. ISSN 0340-5613. JSTOR 23995689.
- Rittmeister, J. F. (1968). "Moral in Stufenfolgen (als Gespräch auszuarbeiten)". Zeitschrift für Psychosomatische Medizin und Psychoanalyse (in German). 14 (2): 150–152. ISSN 2364-3765. JSTOR 23995531.
