= Reichskriegsgericht =

Highest German military court 1900 to 1945

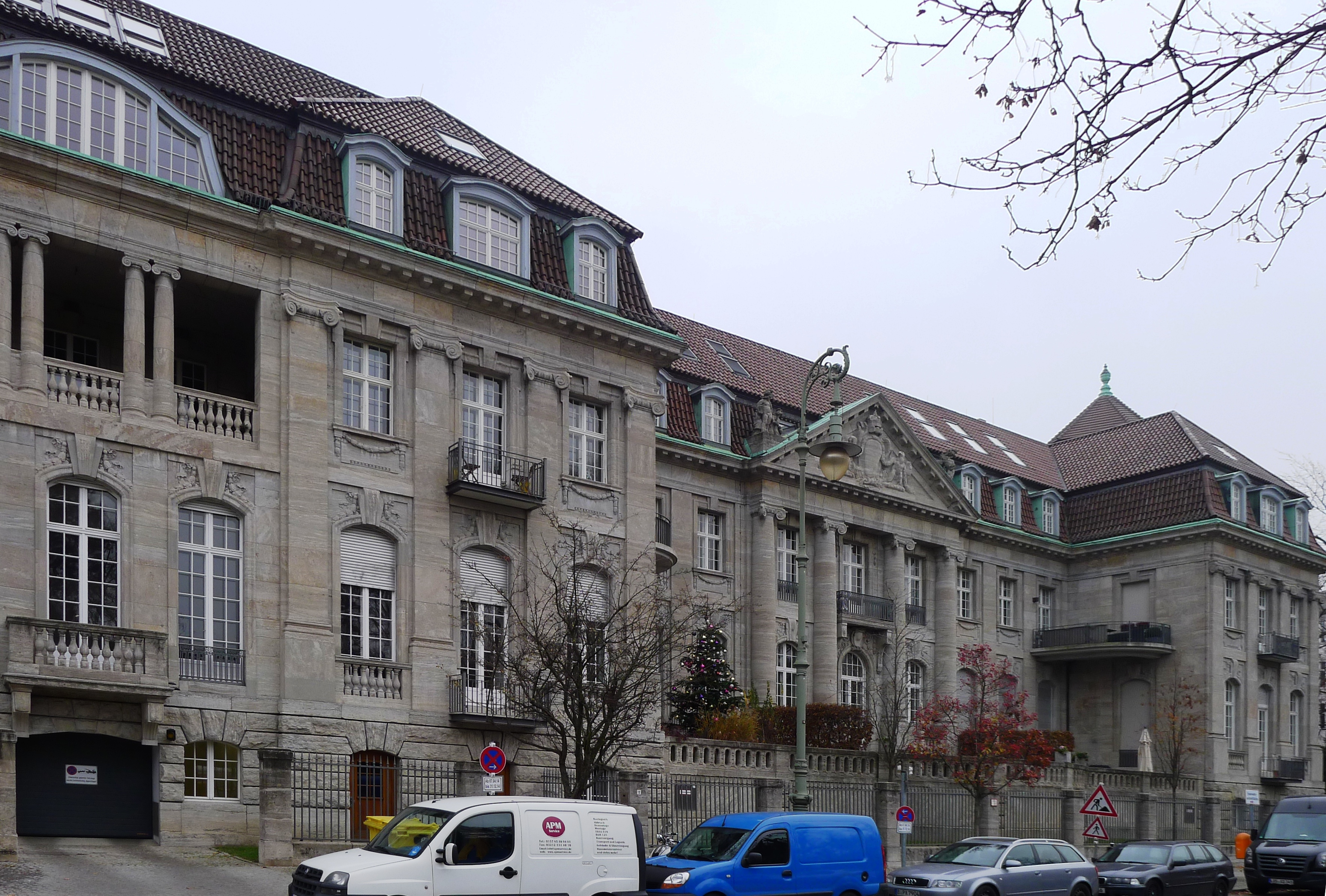
- Former Reichskriegsgericht building on Witzlebenplatz
- Established: 1 October 1900

The Reichskriegsgericht (German pronunciation: [ˈʁaɪçskʁiːksɡəˌʁɪçt], RKG; English: Reich Military Court) was the highest military court in Germany between 1900 and 1945.

== Legal basics and responsibilities ==
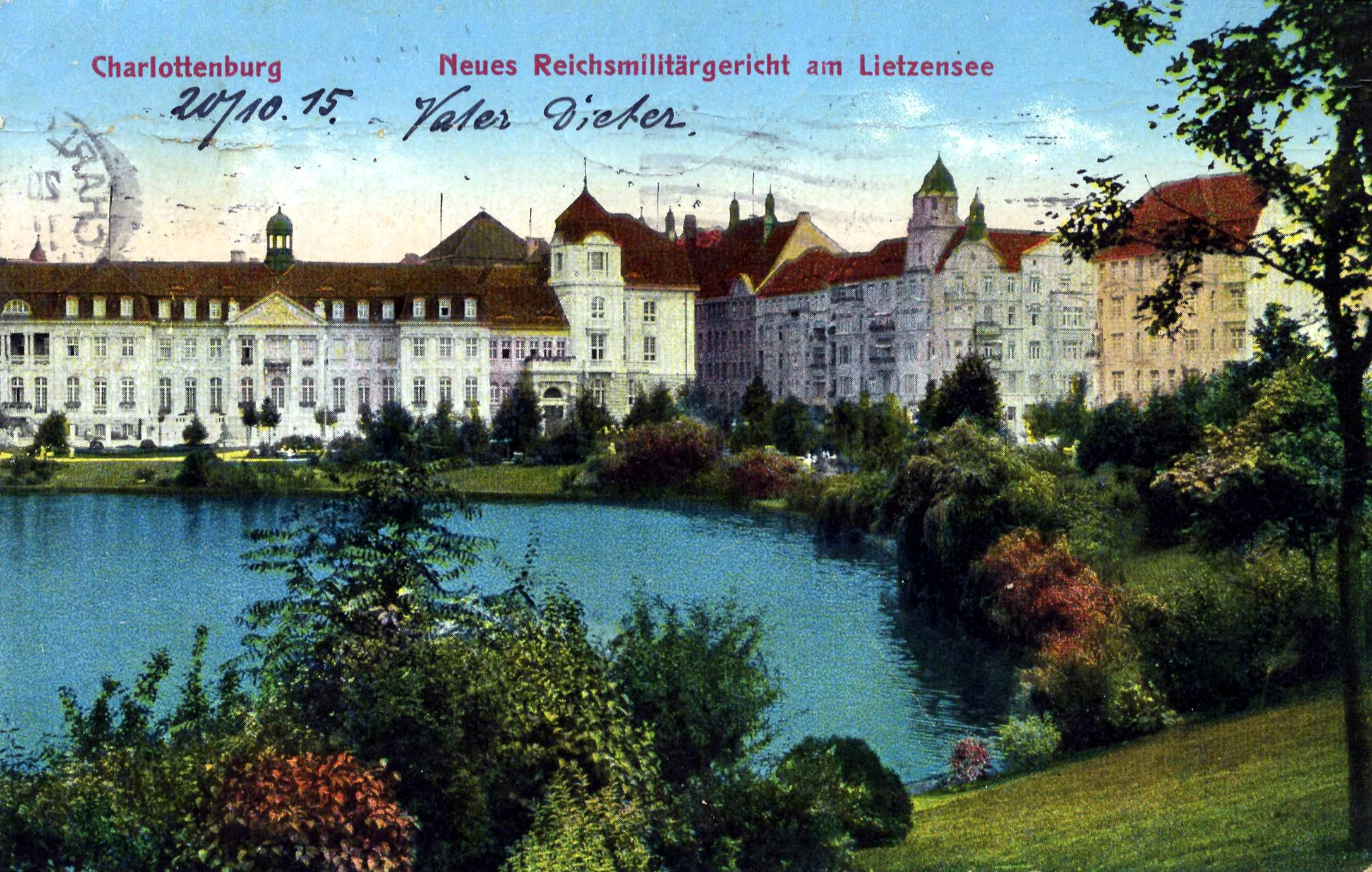
New Reichsmilitärgericht building (left), postcard, c. 1915

After the Prussian-led Unification of Germany, the German Empire with effect from 1 October 1900 had established a particular court-martial jurisdiction (German: Militärgerichtsbarkeit) to try soldiers of the German Army, with the Reichsmilitärgericht (RMG) as the supreme court. The presiding judge in the rank of a general or admiral was appointed directly by the German Emperor. From 1910, the court had its seat in a newly erected prestigious building in Charlottenburg. During World War I, German military law enabled military courts to try not only soldiers but also civilians held to have violated the military law. In the post-war Weimar Republic (1919–1933), the separate jurisdiction for military personnel was abolished by the law of 17 August 1920, based on Article 106 of the Weimar Constitution.

After the Nazi seizure of power in 1933, courts-martial were reinstated by law of May 12, with effect from 1 January 1934. During the German re-armament and the deployment of the Wehrmacht armed forces, the Reichskriegsgericht was re-established as supreme court on 1 October 1936. According to the Wartime Criminal Code of Procedure (Kriegsstrafverfahrensordnung, KStVO) enacted by German Fuhrer Adolf Hitler and Field Marshal Wilhelm Keitel on 17 August 1938, the RKG had jurisdictional competence over acts of high treason, treason, and aiding the enemy (Kriegsverrat); if the defendant was not directly liable to prosecution by his commander-in-chief. The court also had sole responsibility for all legal proceedings against highest-ranking Wehrmacht officers.

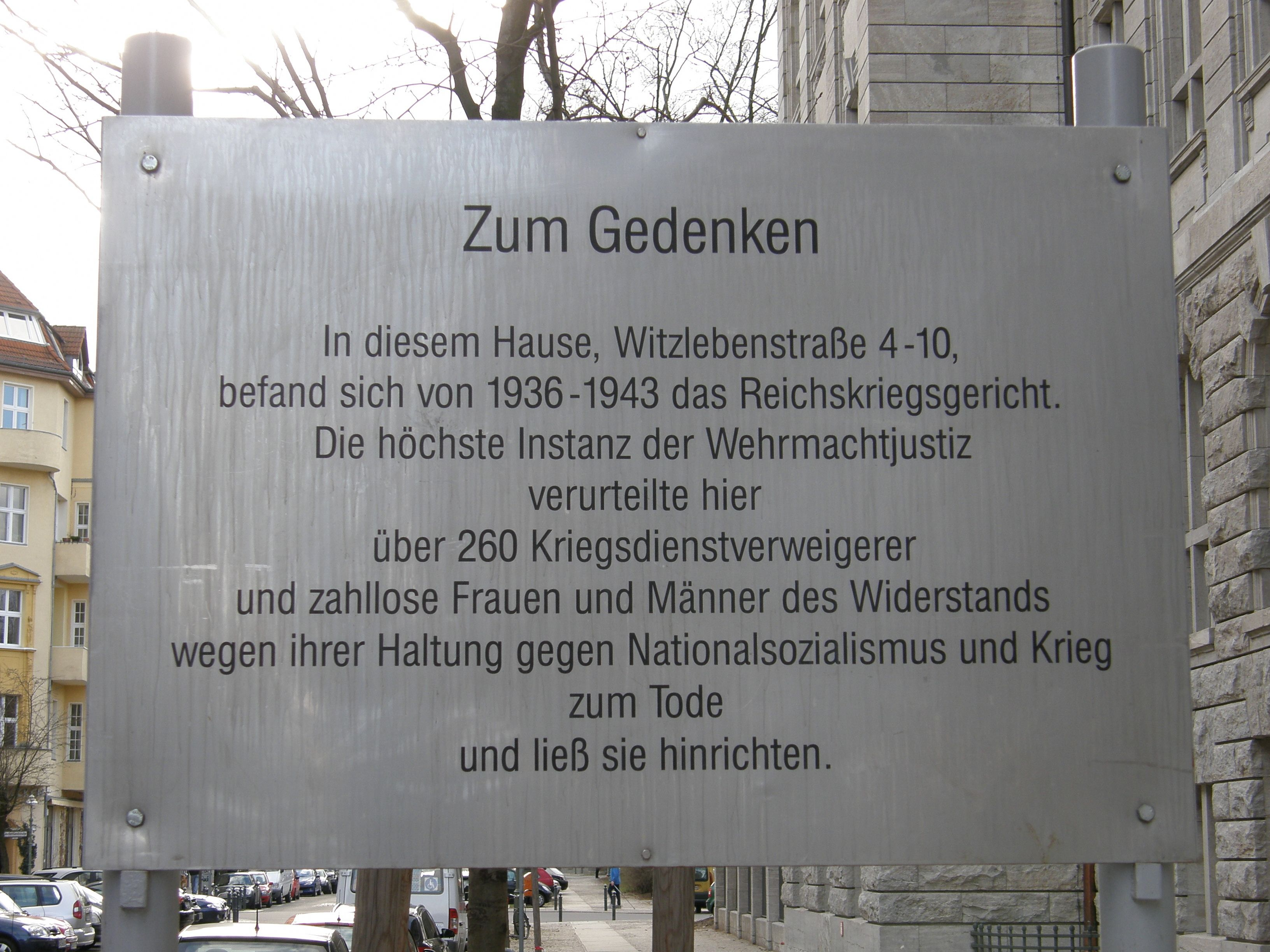
Commemorative plaque to the conscientious objectors and members of the Resistance sentenced at the Reichskriegsgericht

For all severe cases of Wehrkraftzersetzung ("undermining military force") according to Wartime Special Penal Code (Kriegssonderstrafrechtsverordnung, KSSVO), the RKG was the first and last instance. By this accusation, the court sentenced numerous conscientious objectors to death. By ordinance of 18 May 1940, proceedings against civilians were handed over to Sondergericht courts; from 29 January 1943, the "People's Court" (Volksgerichtshof) had exclusive jurisdiction over all accusations of public Wehrkraftzersetzung and intentionally evading military service.

The President of the Reichskriegsgericht was able to affirm or to set aside a judgement; as was Hitler in his capacity as commander-in-chief of the Wehrmacht.

== See also ==
- Command and obedience in the Bundeswehr
- Court martial
- Drumhead court-martial
- Military law
- State of emergency
- Summary execution
- War crimes of the Wehrmacht

== Literature ==
- Norbert Haase: Das Reichskriegsgericht und der Widerstand gegen die nationalsozialistische Herrschaft, Berlin 1993, ISBN 3-926082-04-6 (= Katalog der Sonderausstellung der Gedenkstätte Deutscher Widerstand)
- Günter Gribbohm: Das Reichskriegsgericht – Die Institution und ihre rechtliche Bewertung, Berliner Wiss.–Verlag, Berlin 2004, ISBN 3-8305-0585-X
