= Kuckhoff =

Kuckhoff is a surname. Notable people with the surname include:

- Adam Kuckhoff (1887–1943), German journalist
- Greta Kuckhoff (1902–1981), East German politician
