= Clara Leiser =

American writer, journalist, and activist (c. 1898 – 1991)

- Born: c. 1898; Milwaukee, Wisconsin, U.S.
- Died: May 11, 1991; Manhattan, New York, U.S.
- Education: University of Wisconsin
- Occupations: Journalist; Writer; Activist
- Organizations: Youth of All Nations

Clara Leiser (c. 1898 – May 11, 1991) was an American writer, journalist, and activist. Traveling frequently to Europe in the 1920s and 1930s, she documented the situation of family members of political prisoners in Nazi Germany and published one of those accounts, as well as an (anonymous) interview with the director of a Nazi prison. She was affected by the plight of refugee children who were forced to flee fascism, and founded a non-profit that supported them, promoting peace through correspondence programs, which she continued still in the mid-1950s.

== Biography ==
Leiser was born in Milwaukee, Wisconsin, and attended the University of Wisconsin in Madison in the early 1920s, studying with the linguist and poet William Ellery Leonard, among others. There, she befriended Mildred Harnack, with whom she was friends until Harnack's death. She was a graduate of the class of 1924. Leiser worked as an assistant editor and advertising manager of an education journal in the 1920s, but gave that up to be able to travel to Europe during the rise of the Nazi regime. She worked with young refugees who were displaced by European fascism, and this led her in 1944 to found Youth of All Nations (YOAN), a non-profit that promoted peace through correspondence programs. By 1955, YOAN was active worldwide; then-Senator Hubert Humphrey spoke out for the organization in the Senate in 1955, and entered a plea for support by Leiser, and quotations from letters by young people from various parts of the world who had built correspondence friendships through YOAN, into the Congressional Record.

Leiser died in 1991 in Manhattan of congestive heart failure at age 93.

== Anti-Nazi scholarship and publications ==
Leiser became friends with Mildred Harnack while studying at the University of Wisconsin, early in the 1920s. Leiser visited Harnack and her husband, Arvid Harnack, in Europe, and Harnack stayed with her in 1937, when Leiser lived in New York.

In 1938, Leiser published an article in the Journal of Criminal Law and Criminology, which contained an interview with an anonymous director of a Nazi prison, who described the conditions inside the prison. Leiser noted that "this official does not resign his position or leave Germany because he feels that he can best fight the regime by keeping eyes and ears open as to who is in prison and why, so far as any one person can become so informed, and by treating the people in his charge with as much decency as he can 'get away with.'"

One of Leiser's goals in Nazi Germany was to collect information on the family members of political prisoners; in 1940, she translated, edited, and published Refugee, the autobiographical account by Hilde Koch. The German anti-Nazi activist met Leiser, introduced by a friend, after she had experienced that her husband, F. Koch, was imprisoned in Sonnenburg concentration camp and was released; he later fled to the United States. Koch told Leiser with growing trust of her experiences, and later described the act of sharing oppressing secrets as comforting and liberating. (Note: Koch: "Es tat ja so unendlich gut sich einmal aussprechen zu koennen. Einmal etwas herunterzureden von all dem was da in der Brust verschlossen aufgespeichert war." (It did feel so good to be able to talk things out for once. To be able to talk down something from all that was stored in my heart.)) Refugee contained an "intense" recollection of the Nazi coup and the events of January 30, 1933, in what scholar Anna Iuso saw as a tragic mood; at that time, such autobiographical accounts were popular, but anonymously, with the origin masked.

When she learned of the execution of her friend Mildred Harnack by the Nazis in 1943, she wrote a poem of 18 pages, "To and from the guillotine", remembering and imagining stations of her life and death in detail.

== Bibliography ==
- Jean de Reszke and the Great Days of Opera (New York: Minton, Balch, and Company, 1934)
- Lunacy Becomes Us (selections of quotations from Hitler and other Nazis), Liveright, 1939
- Refugee: The personal account of two "Aryan" Germans whom Nazi brutality failed to crush by Hilde Koch, trans. and edited by Clara Leiser (New York: Prentice-Hall, 1940)
- Skeleton of Justice (with Edith Roper) (E.P. Dutton, 1941; reprinted 1975, New York: AMS Press)
