= Arvid Harnack =

German jurist, economist, and resistance fighter in Nazi Germany (1901–1942)

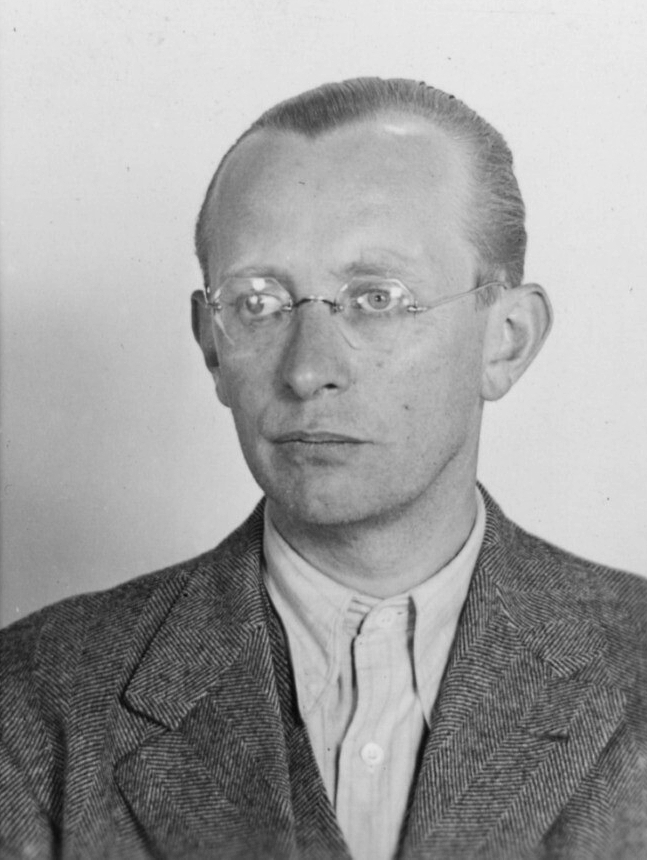
- Harnack in 1942
- Born: 24 May 1901; Darmstadt, Grand Duchy of Hesse, German Empire
- Died: 22 December 1942 (aged 41); Plötzensee Prison, Berlin, Nazi Germany
- Education: Friedrich Schiller University; London School of Economics; University of Wisconsin; University of Giessen
- Known for: Member of the Red Orchestra ("Rote Kapelle")
- Spouse: Mildred Fish (m. 1926)

Arvid Harnack (German: [ˈaʁvɪt ˈhaʁnak]; 24 May 1901 – 22 December 1942) was a German jurist, Marxist economist, Communist, and German resistance fighter in Nazi Germany. Harnack came from an intellectual family and was originally a humanist. He was strongly influenced by Johann Wolfgang von Goethe but progressively moved to a Marxist-Socialist outlook after a visit to the Soviet Union and the Nazis' appearance. After starting an undercover discussion group based at the Berlin Abendgymnasium, he met Harro Schulze-Boysen, who ran a similar faction. Like numerous groups in other parts of the world, the undercover political factions led by Harnack and Schulze-Boysen later developed into an espionage network that supplied military and economic intelligence to the Soviet Union. The group was later called the Red Orchestra (Rote Kapelle) by the Abwehr. He and his American-born wife, Mildred Fish, were executed by the Nazi regime in 1942 and 1943, respectively.

== Life ==
Die vormarxistische Arbeiterbewegung in den Vereinigten Staaten: eine Darstellung ihrer Geschichte. (The pre-Marxist labour movement in the United States: an account of its history) University of Jena: G. Fischer, 1931

Harnack's family were prominent and academically gifted Protestant Germans from the Baltic region. His father was literary history professor Otto Harnack and his mother was Clara Harnack (née Reichau), an artist. Reichau was the granddaughter of Justus von Liebig, one of the principal founders of organic chemistry. Harnack's siblings were Falk Harnack, his elder brother; Inge Harnack; and Angela Harnack, a violin teacher. Harnack was the nephew of theologian Adolf von Harnack.

In 1919 he became a member of the Freikorps, a volunteer militia. From 1919 to 1923 he studied law at the Friedrich Schiller University, the University of Graz, and the University of Hamburg; he became a Doctor of Law in 1924. He completed postgraduate studies in economics in Hamburg and the London School of Economics before being awarded a Rockefeller scholarship to study at the University of Wisconsin. In Madison, Wisconsin, Harnack was influenced by the industrial economist and labor historian John R. Commons, and saw him as a mentor.

In 1926, Harnack met American literary historian Mildred Fish, also a graduate student at the University of Wisconsin, after Harnack wandered into the wrong lecture hall. After a brief friendship and romance, they were engaged on 6 June 1926 and married on 7 August 1926. The couple met Margaretha "Greta" Lorke, a German student of sociology, at a Friday evening gathering organized by Commons in Madison. A friendship that lasted for many years developed between Mildred and Lorke, the latter being drawn into an intimate group of Wisconsin radicals known as the Friday Niters Club. According to a fellow student and member of the group, Hazel Briggs Rice, the Friday Niters Club members considered themselves to be liberal Progressives. Lorke later married Adam Kuckhoff. The Harnacks' Friday Niters Club was a preface to their involvement in what became known as the Sacco and Vanzetti case, which became a cause célèbre. Many in the group protested the planned execution of the pair, and Arvid petitioned the governor to create a committee to investigate the controversy. The trial radicalised the Harnacks.

At the end of the semester in March 1928, Arvid returned to Germany, as his fellowship had ended, while Mildred stayed for another year to complete her studies before moving to Germany on 2 June 1929, at which point the couple lived in the small university towns of Jena and Giessen. In 1931, Arvid was promoted to his second doctorate, a Doctor of Philosophy from University of Giessen with a thesis titled: Die vormarxistische Arbeiterbewegung in den Vereinigten Staaten ("The Pre-Marxist Workers' Movement in the United States") that dealt explicitly with the history of the American workers' movement. The thesis was sponsored by Friedrich Lenz, who founded the Giessen School of National Economics.

The Harnacks, like many of their literary counterparts, shared an interest in the Soviet Union. They decided to set up a study group in the autumn of 1931, along with Lenz. At the height of the Great Depression, Harnack's hope was that Germany could serve as a spiritual and economic bridge between the East and West. Lenz believed that only an alliance with the Soviet Union would relieve Germany of the constraints of the Treaty of Versailles, re-establish the country's position, and return it to great nation status.

=== ARPLAN ===
Harnack founded the Wissenschaftliche Arbeitsgemeinschaft zum Studium der sowjetischen Planwirtschaft ("Scientific Working Community for the Study of the Soviet Planned Economy"), or ARPLAN, with Lenz in 1931. It was an organisation of writers and academics that met once a month to discuss the Soviet planned economy. Harnack became secretary of the group and Lenz became the president. The first meeting took place on 3 and 4 January 1932. The study group had around 50 members. Some of the more prominent members were the economist Emil Lederer, the sociologist and historian Alfred Meusel, the politician Otto Hoetzsch, the political scientist Klaus Mehnert, the Marxist philosopher György Lukács, the Marxist historian Hermann Duncker, the playwright and historian Karl August Wittfogel, the politician Ernst Niekisch, the publicist Hans Ebeling, the philosopher Ernst Jünger and politician Count von Ernst Graf zu Reventlow.

Also among them was the leading Soviet economist and diplomat Sergei Bessonov, who at the time was a member of the Russian trade delegation, and Alexander Hirschfeld, who was Arvid's contact at the Soviet embassy in Berlin. At the time, the Harnacks were also members of the Association of Intellectual Workers (Bund der Geistesarbeiter), a communist front organisation. They were seen by Moscow as able to recruit "people of good will" or "people of influence" but not necessarily party members. According to Georgi Dimitrov, the head of Communist International, the organizations allowed them to extend their influence to people that were difficult to reach. Communist or KPD members stayed in the background in meetings that were open to everyone, but controlled the discussion to gain influence. The real purpose of organisations like ARPLAN was to draw influential people who supported a pro-Soviet agenda in relation to German policy. Bessonov was ordered to recruit suitable German technocrats for visits to the Soviet Union and extract useful information for the Soviet trade legation.

=== Salon ===
In January 1932, Mildred lost her position teaching English literature at the University of Berlin. In May 1932, the couple were forced to move to 61 Hasenheide in Neukölln due to the presence of Nazis, which they leased from Stefan Heym. In his postwar novel, Nachruf, Heym stated he found the Harnacks to be a genial academic couple who had "resolute views" on the Nazis. The Harnacks hosted a Saturday salon at Hasenheide where intellectual discussion among editors, publishers, and authors was freely shared, and where Harnack lectured on political economy and Marxism. Amongst those who attended were publishers Samuel Fischer, Ernst Rowohlt, and Heinrich Marie Ledig-Rowohlt; translator Franz Frein; physician and writer Max Mohr; authors and playwrights Adam Kuckhoff, Max Tau, Otto Zoff, and Ernst von Salomon; journalist Margret Boveri; critic Erich Franzen; and some of Mildred's students, including Friedrich Schlösinger.

23 members of ARPLAN, including Harnack, went on a three-week study trip to the Soviet Union from 20 August to 12 September 1932, which was organised with the help of Bessonov and the Soviet embassy. They observed the Soviet economy in Moscow, Leningrad, Odessa, Kiev, and the Dnieper region. There were allegations that Harnack was recruited by Soviet intelligence during the trip. David Dallin describes the trip as the turning point in Harnack's life, and that Harnack agreed to spy was for the Soviet Union when he was bluntly asked by senior Comintern leaders. This allegation was repeated in 1994 by the KGB's deputy director, Pavel Sudoplatov, though it was not recorded in Harnack's own records. Even though the group travelled through Ukraine as academics and took notes, it failed to notice the famine before them; when Arthur Koestler went there around the same time, he documented starving people in almost every station. Koestler believed that the Harnacks' mentality was driven by the influence of Soviet propaganda, and that although they knew the standard of living in the West was much higher than the Soviet Union, they judged that Soviet citizens were much better off under Stalin than they were under the czar.

=== Career change ===
By the end of 1932, Harnack could not pursue an academic career, as the universities overwhelmingly supported Hitler, and he was no longer eligible for a career as a National Socialist. His thesis on "The Pre-Marxist Workers' Movement in the United States" could no longer be published. In the same year, he instructed illegal training courses for former members of the Marxist Workers School (MASCH) and at the Berliner Abendgymnasium ("Berliner Städtische Abendgymnasium für Erwachsene"), an evening high school for adults seeking to obtain the Abitur and university admission. Mildred also taught English literature at the same school. While at the Abendgymnasium, Harnack met KPD member and design engineer Karl Behrens, one of Mildred's students, who became one of Harnack's closest comrades-in-arms in the resistance.

After Adolf Hitler's rise to power and the Reichstag fire in early 1933, the Harnacks kept a low profile; they decided to dissolve ARPLAN in March 1933. The membership list was destroyed and many members fled abroad. Lenz was attacked at Giessen University by the Schutzstaffel, his house was raided, and he was dismissed from the university in September due to being "politically unreliable".

== Resistance ==
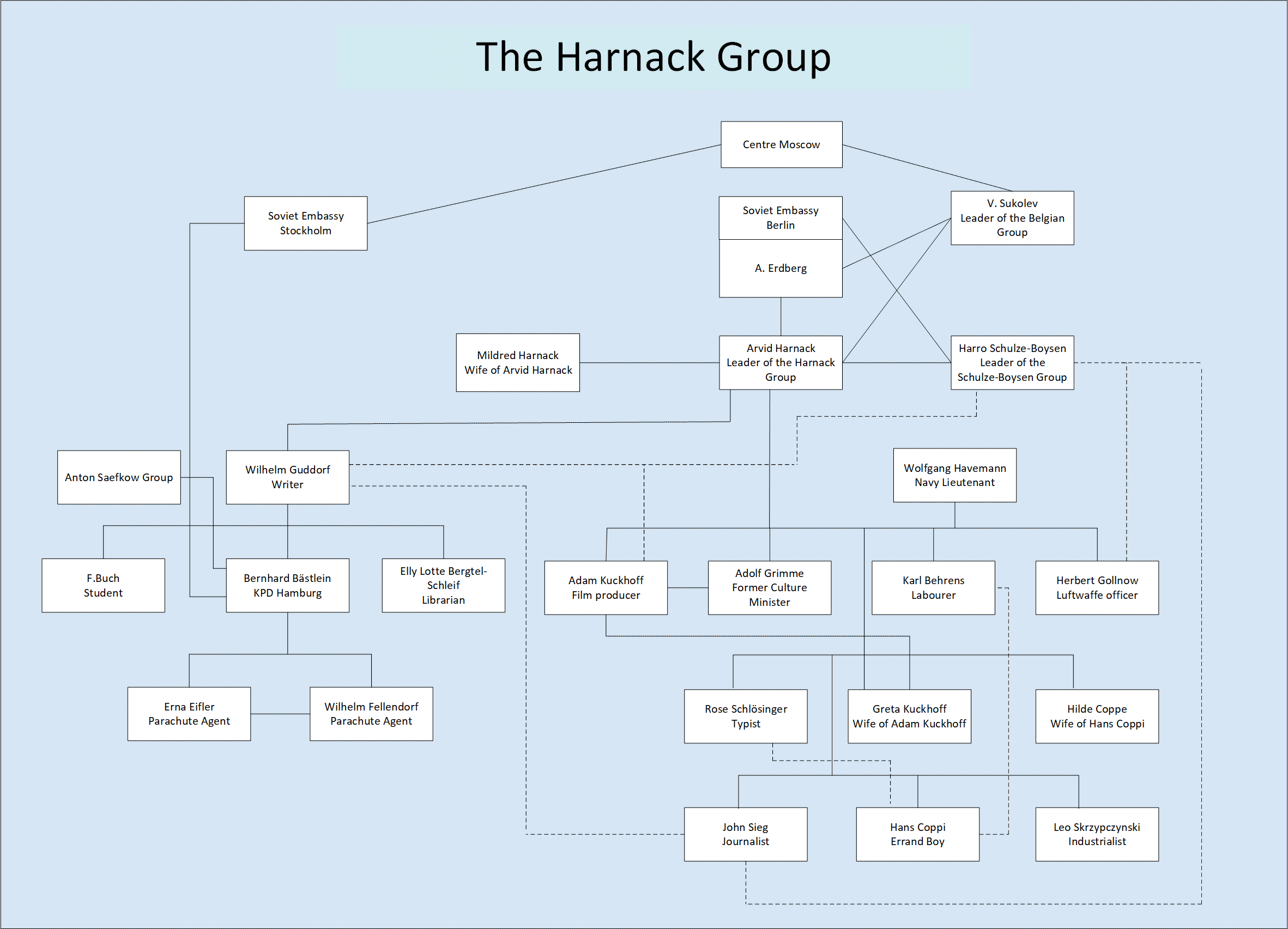
The Harnack group in Germany

=== Early stages ===
In 1933, Harnack was appointed advisor at the Reich Ministry of Economics (Reichswirtschaftsministerium), before becoming a senior civil servant (Oberregierungsrat) in 1938, and worked on payment balances and foreign exchange questions about trade. As chief of trade policy, Harnack was part of many decision-making processes involving a very large number of people, including contacts in the German Foreign Office (Auswärtiges Amt). Over time, Harnack gathered detailed knowledge of the German economy, and when he was promoted to senior civil servant, he was legitimately able to form contacts with American trade counterparts at the American embassy. The same year, he also finished his legal qualifications in Jena, and successfully completed the junior law examination.

With the Kuckhoffs, the Harnacks assembled a discussion circle that debated political perspectives on the time after the Nazis' expected downfall. Between 1928 and 1929, Adam Kuckhoff headed the cultural-political magazine Die Tat ("The Deed"). At that time, he became acquainted with the communist John Sieg, who was previously a reporter on the communist newspaper, Die Rote Fahne. Harnack was good friends with lawyer and academic Carl Dietrich von Trotha, and knew lawyer Horst von Einsiedel since 1934. The group met to discuss and disseminate communist theories that included material Harnack was able to copy from the ministry.

In 1934, the couple moved to the third-floor apartment at 16 Schöneberger Woyrschstraße, close to the Tiergarten. The house was destroyed in the war and is now known as 14 Genthiner Straße.

By 1935, Harnack was employed as a lecturer on foreign policy at the University of Berlin. On 8 August 1935, three months after Harnack joined the trade ministry, he met with Hirschfeld in a meeting that lasted three hours. During the meeting, Hirschfeld informed Harnack that his position in the trade ministry could provide useful information that could be used to defeat the Nazis, and offered to establish a system to convey the documents to Moscow. Harnack agreed to be an informer and was given the codename Balt, assigned a control officer, Alexander Belkin, and given a mission to increase his sources by building a network of contacts.

However, Hirschfeld requested that Harnack break off all relations with the KPD, and to avoid working for the resistance, but Harnack refused; he was never interested in becoming a Soviet agent, considered himself a communist, and would supply information to anybody who would take part in anti-fascist operations that helped to destroy the Nazis.

According to KGB sources, between 1935 and 1938 Harnack supplied information about German currency, German investments abroad, and details of the German foreign debt. He also provided details of secret trade agreements to Soviet intelligence. During that period, Harnack circulated the same information to other groups. In 1935, Harnack met Harro Schulze-Boysen for the first time, but Harnack decided not to meet again due to their different temperaments.

At the end of 1937, and formally on 3 March 1938, U.S. ambassador William Dodd was replaced by Hugh Wilson. Joining him as First Secretary and monetary attaché at the U.S. Embassy was Donald Heath.

U.S. Secretary of the Treasury Henry Morgenthau Jr. felt that the Berlin embassy needed a treasury attaché who could ferret out German economic information, so Heath became an intelligence agent in the office of coordination at the embassy (a forerunner of the Office of Strategic Services). His job was to recruit sympathetic informers that could provide that type of information. Mildred met Louise Heath, Donald's wife, at the American Women's Club in Bellevuestrasse in 1937. The Harnacks became friends with the Heaths, but Arvid was resistant to Donald's proposal at first; by 1938 he started providing him with intelligence.

At the start of World War II, Louise and Donald Heath Jr. fled to Norway before returning several months later. When they returned, Louise asked Mildred to tutor her son in American literature. The two couples began to regularly spend weekends together and occasionally went on vacation together. At other times Arvid and Donald met in the countryside to exchange intelligence, but it became increasingly dangerous. Between December 1939 and March 1941, Donald Jr. couriered between Harnack and the American embassy, delivered food from Denmark and Italy, and gave medicine to the Harnacks. After the war, Donald acknowledged that Arvid was his source for German economic intelligence.

In 1937, former Prussian minister of culture and religious socialist Adolf Grimme was brought into the group through Kuckhoff and playwright Günther Weisenborn. Harnack had previously met Grimme at the funeral of Adolf von Harnack on 10 June 1930. Grimme was a religious socialist who belonged to the Covenant of Religious Socialists of Germany, so Harnack used considerable effort to convince him to become a communist.

On 26 January 1937, a new civil service law gave Nazi officials the power to fire tenured civil servants. Walther Funk, Harnack's manager at the Ministry, persuaded him to join the Nazi Party to protect himself, and become what was known as a Hamburger (i.e. Nazi brown outside, Moscow red inside). In May 1937, Harnack joined the Nazi Party with the number 4153569.

Harnack's nephew, Wolfgang Havemann, became a frequent visitor to the group discussions after 1938.

=== Harnack/Schulze-Boysen Group ===
In 1940, Harnack came into contact with other resistance groups and began to cooperate with them. The most important of these was a small group called Gegner Kreis that was run by Harro Schulze-Boysen, a Luftwaffe lieutenant and descendant of an old German military family, who had known Harnack since 1935, but was reintroduced to him sometime in late 1939 or early 1940 through Greta Kuckhoff. The Kuckhoffs had known the Schulz-Boysens since 1938, and started to engage them socially in autumn 1940 by bringing Mildred and Libertas (Harro's wife) together while on holiday in Saxony. Harnack and Schulze-Boysen were wary of meeting due but finally met in October 1940 at the house of Adam's and Greta Kuckhoff apartment at Wilhelmshöher Allee 19 in Friedenau.

On 17 September 1940, the Harnacks met the third secretary member of the Soviet embassy, Alexander Korotkov who used the alias Alexander Erdberg while meeting the couple in their Tiergarten apartment. Korotkov was a Soviet intelligence agent who had been operating clandestinely in Europe for much of the 1930s as an employee of the foreign intelligence service of the Soviet People's Commissariat for State Security (NKGB), but had been dismissed during Stalin's purges. He managed to get back into the service . Initially wary and suspicious of the uninvited guest, Korotkov proposed a second meeting at the Soviet Embassy in Berlin to Harnack, where Korotkov could demonstrate his good faith and prove to Harnack that he was not a decoy. Several reasons were given as to why Harnack decided to become a spy, including a need for money, being ideologically driven, and possibly blackmail by Russian intelligence. It was known that Harnack had his own agenda, and that he wanted Germany to be separate from Nazism and the Soviet Union. According to a statement by Korotkov discovered after the war, he thought Harnack was not motivated by money or ideologically driven, but that he was specifically building an anti-fascist organisation for Germany, as opposed to an espionage network for Russian or American intelligence; Harnack considered himself a German patriot.

Korotkov considered Harnack a moral person, and that while he reported to his Soviet directors, he felt the Soviet Union "was a country whose ideals he felt connected to". Harnack often told his friends of his aversion to the Soviet Union and once told Grimme that Germany would "need a fist not to become a puppet of the Soviet Union".

On 26 September 1940, Harnack provided Erdberg with his first intelligence report that reported the Nazi state was in the planning stages for a war against the Soviet Union. In mid-April 1941, in an attempt to increase the influx of intelligence, the Soviets ordered Korotkov to create a Berlin espionage operation and Harnack was asked by Korotkov to run it. Korotkov was instructed by Soviet intelligence to provide a person in Berlin that could be contacted via radio in the event of war. Harnack refused to be contacted in that manner and agreed only to collect and encipher the material in his own apartment, but the transmission would take place somewhere else. In June 1941, with Harnack's approval, Korotkov delivered a wireless transmitter to Greta Kuckhoff during a meeting at an underground railway station. The device was mounted in a case and had a range of 600 miles, but the battery only lasted two hours. The aim of the operation was to organise the Harnack group into an independent network with direct contact with Soviet intelligence. In May, two additional shortwave radio transmitters were delivered by diplomatic pouch; one was battery powered. The second one was dismantled so that it could fit into a suitcase, and required an electrical supply to operate. However, when Adam Kuckhoff tested the first transmitter, it failed to work so it was returned the following week. Along with the radio transmitter, Korotkov gave Harnack 12,000 Reichsmarks and Adam Kuckhoff 500 Reichsmarks. Harnack distributed the money to his agents: Behrens received 5000 marks, Leo Skrzipczynski received 3,000, Grimme received 2,000, and Rose Schloesinger received 1,000. The rest of the money was used by Harnack for daily expenses

Harnack acted as the intermediary when transmitting reports, which were delivered from several people, including Schulze-Boysen, and were encyphered and passed to Hans Coppi for transmission. The courier was initially Behrens, but Schlösinger took over when Behrens became unavailable. On 1 July 1941, Korotkov and the Soviet embassy staff, along with many other Soviet citizens, left Germany.

In June 1941, after the German invasion of the Soviet Union, the resistance group intensified its leaflet propaganda. At the same time, the group started to collect military intelligence in a careful, systematic manner that could be used to overthrow the Nazis. Members of both groups were convinced that Germany could only be liberated by the Nazis' military defeat, and that by shortening the war, millions of people could be saved.

In 1941, Harnack sent the Soviets information about the forthcoming invasion. That same year, he wrote for the resistance magazine, Die Innere Front ("The Home Front"), the twice-monthly newspaper written in six languages that was created by John Sieg. In 1942, Harnack produced a study called "Das nationalsoialistische Stadium des Monopolkapitalismus" (The National stage of monopoly capitalism), published in Die Innere Front, which described the Gestapo as a tendentious and antigovernment economic treatise, and was read as far as Munich and Hamburg.

In the summer of 1942, Sieg recruited Wilhelm Guddorf, a communist writer and former editor of the Die Rote Fahne. From January to August 1942, Harnack was forced to pass his intelligence via courier. Harnack arranged with the Communist Party in Hamburg via Bernhard Bästlein to pass the reports through contacts in Flensburg and Denmark to the Soviet embassy in Stockholm. Bästlein was a close associate of Guddorf.

=== Discovery ===
The discovery of the illegal radio transmissions of Soviet agent Johann Wenzel by the German radio counterintelligence organization Funkabwehr and his capture by the Gestapo on 29–30 June 1942 eventually revealed the members of the group and led to the Harnacks' arrest. Wenzel decided to cooperate after he was tortured. His exposure of the radio codes enabled Referat 12, the cipher bureaux of the Funkabwehr, to decipher Red Orchestra message traffic. The unit had been tracking Red Orchestra radio transmissions since June 1941, and found Wenzel's house in Brussels contained a large number of coded messages. Wilhelm Vauck, principal cryptographer of the Funkabwehr, received the ciphers from Wenzel. On 15 July 1942, Vauck managed to decrypt a message dated 10 October 1941 that gave the locations of the Kuckhoffs and Schulze-Boysens' apartments.

When Vauck decrypted this message, it was forwarded to Reich Security Main Office IV 2A, where they identified the people living at the three addresses. The three couples were put under surveillance on 16 July 1942. There was a member of Schulze-Boysen's group working in Referat 12 in Vauck's team: Horst Heilmann, who was supplying Schulze-Boysen with intelligence. Heilmann tried to contact Schulze-Boysen but was unsuccessful and left a message with him to phone him back. Schulze-Boysen returned the call, but Vauck answered the phone, and when he requested the name of the caller to take a message and was met with Schulze-Boysen, the deception was revealed and the group exposed.

== Trial and death ==
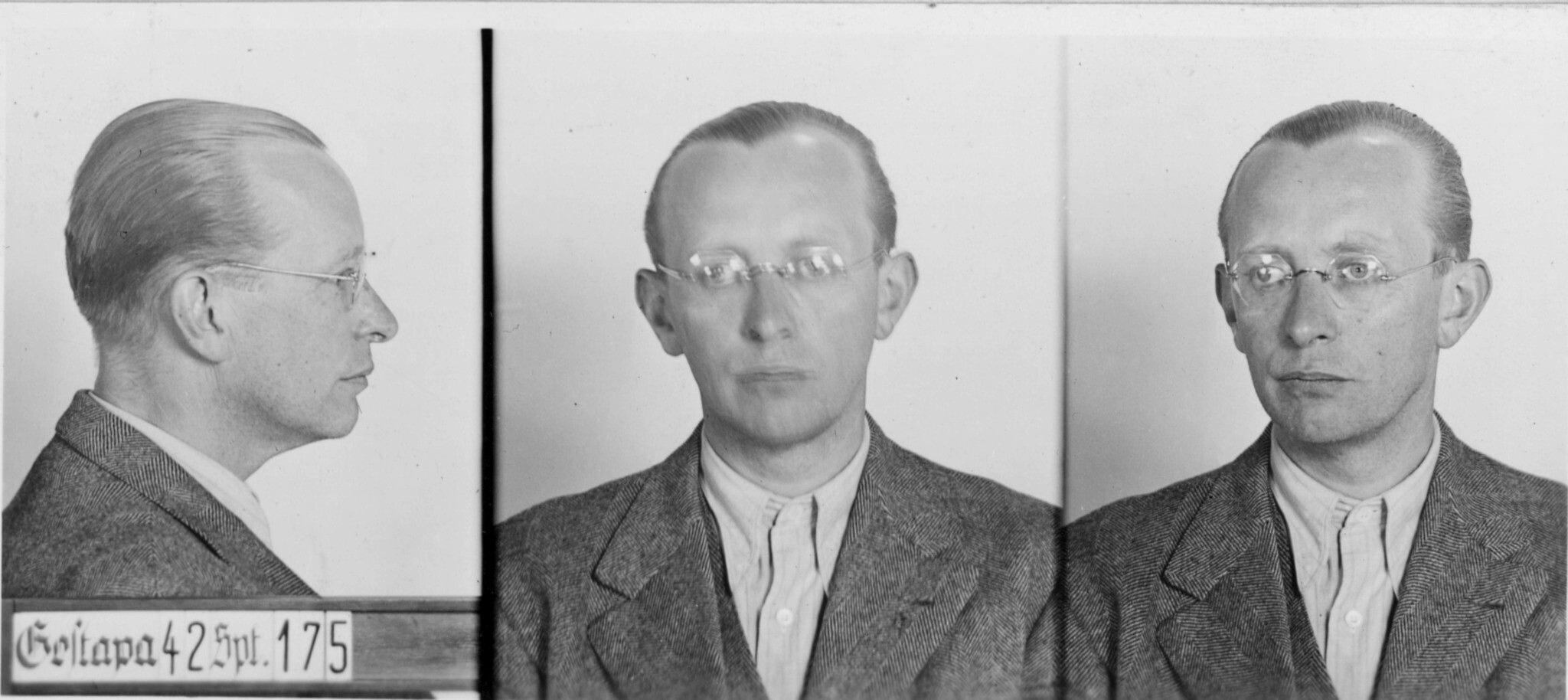
Harnack's Gestapo mugshot, 1942

On 7 September 1942, the Harnacks were arrested by the Gestapo while on a short holiday to Preila on the Curonian Spit.

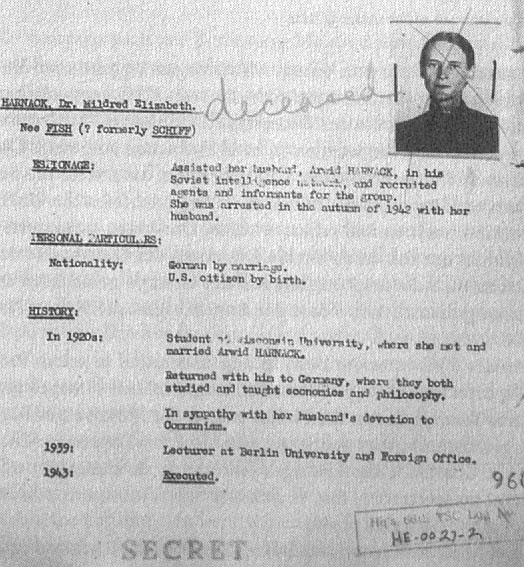
CIC file ref. Mildred Harnack (about 1947)

Arvid was sentenced to death on 19 December after a four-day trial before the Reichskriegsgericht ("Reich Military tribunal"), and was put to death three days later at Plötzensee Prison in Berlin. He and his co-conspirators were hanged from meat hooks by piano wire, a method designed to prolong their suffering. Mildred was originally sentenced to six years in prison, but Hitler swiftly cancelled the sentence and ordered a new trial, which resulted in a death sentence. She was beheaded by guillotine, and her body was released to Hermann Stieve, anatomy professor at Humboldt University, to be dissected for research. A cenotaph was installed for the Harnacks after the war by Arvid's older brother Falk, a member of the White Rose resistance group, at Zehlendorf Cemetery.

== Awards and honours ==
- On 6 October 1969, Harnack was posthumously awarded the Order of the Red Banner. This honour has been proven to be erroneous, as it mistakenly interpreted Red Orchestra as a communist spy network working for the Soviets. This interpretation of the resistance group, based on original slander by the Gestapo, was used in a similar way in the West, in which the rebels were not honoured there, but persecuted as traitors until the 1970s.
- In Magdeburg, a street called Harnackstraße is named after the Harnacks, as well as similar named streets in Lichtenberg, Berlin; and Reudnitz, Leipzig.
- In Jena, a street known as the Arvid-Harnack-Straße is named after him.
- In the courtyard location at Unter den Linden 6 of the Humboldt University of Berlin is a memorial stone.
- In Neukölln, Berlin, in the Hasenheide, on the corner of Lilienthalstraße, a plaque commemorates the Harnacks and Heym.
- Stolpersteins for the Harnakcs were laid in front of 14 Genthiner Straße 14 in the Tiergarten on 20 September 2013 in the presence of US Ambassador John B. Emerson.

== Gallery ==
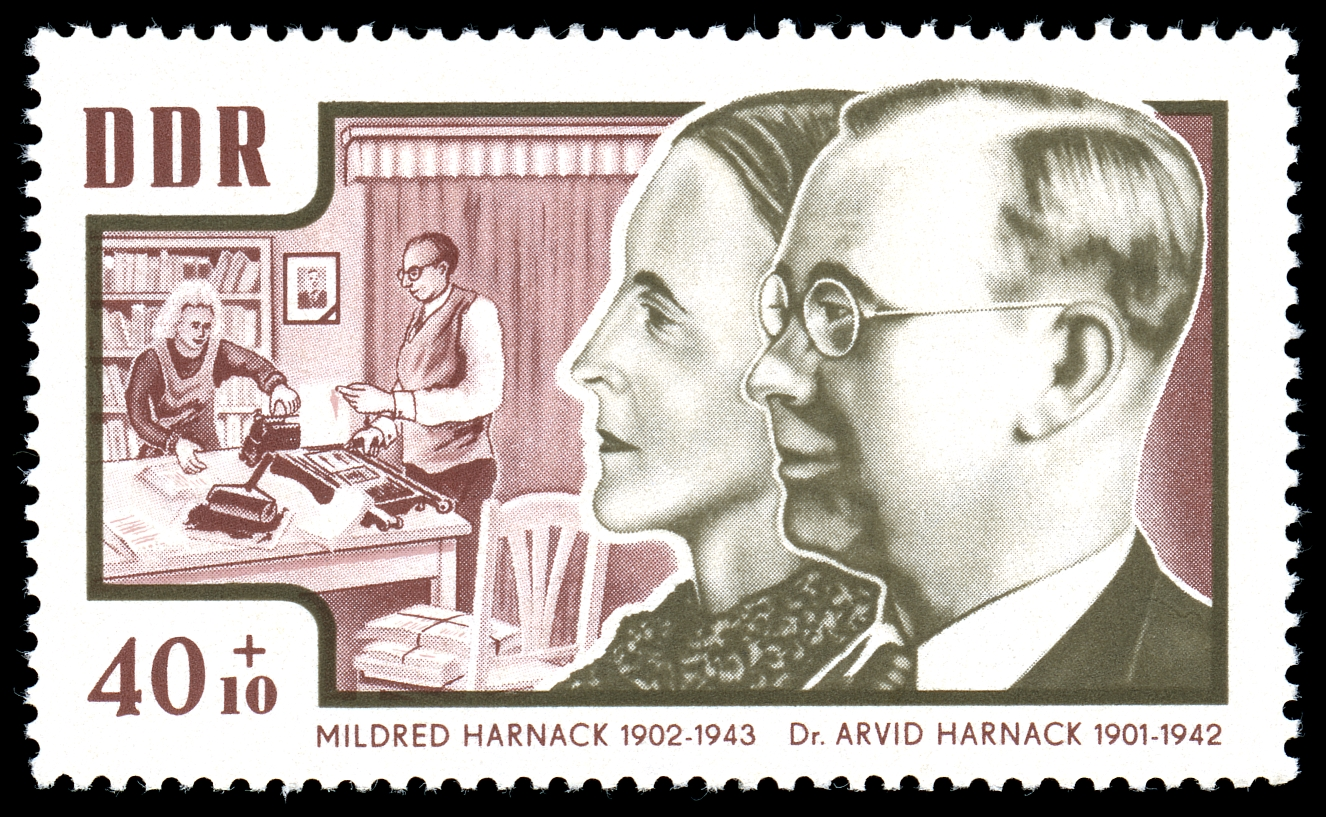
A Commemorative stamp honouring Mildred Harnack and her husband Arvid that was issued by the Deutsche Post of the GDR in 1964

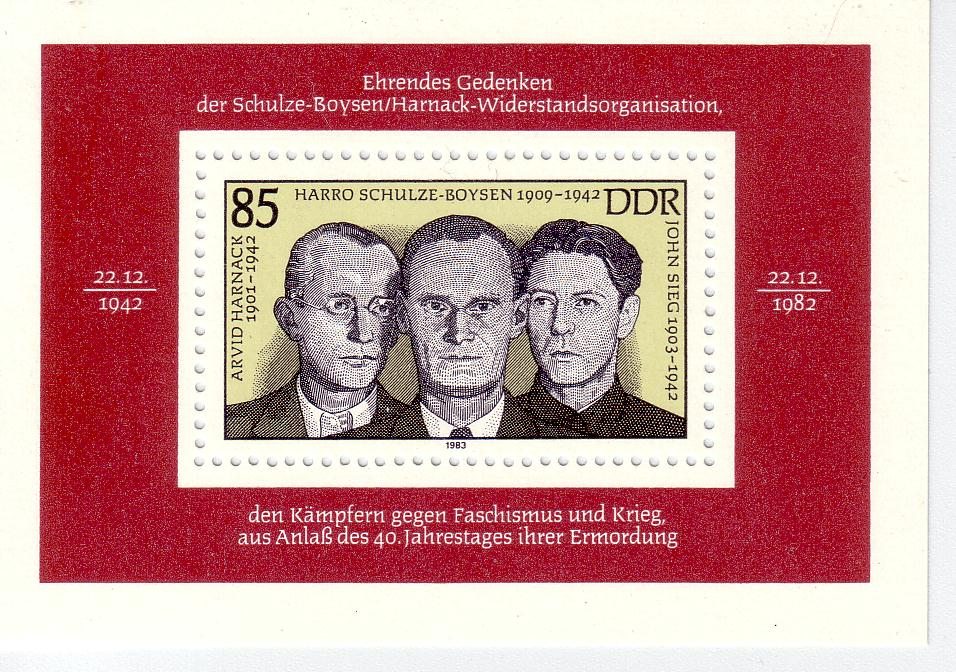
A Commemorative stamp honouring Arvid Harnack, Harro Schulze-Boysen and John Sieg, from the GDR, 1983

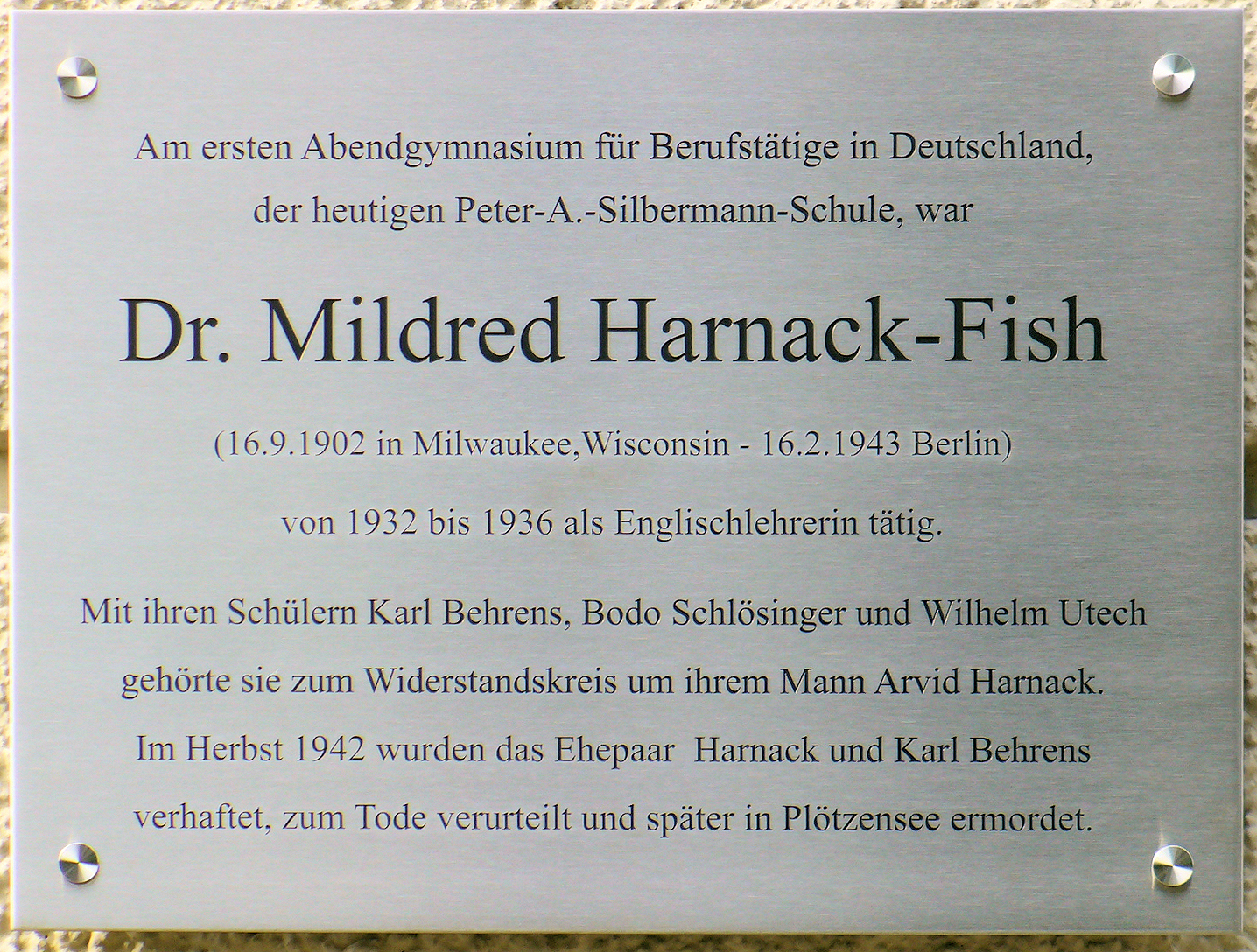
Commemorative plaque at the Peter A. Silbermann School/Friedrich Ebert Secondary School in Berlin-Wilmersdorf

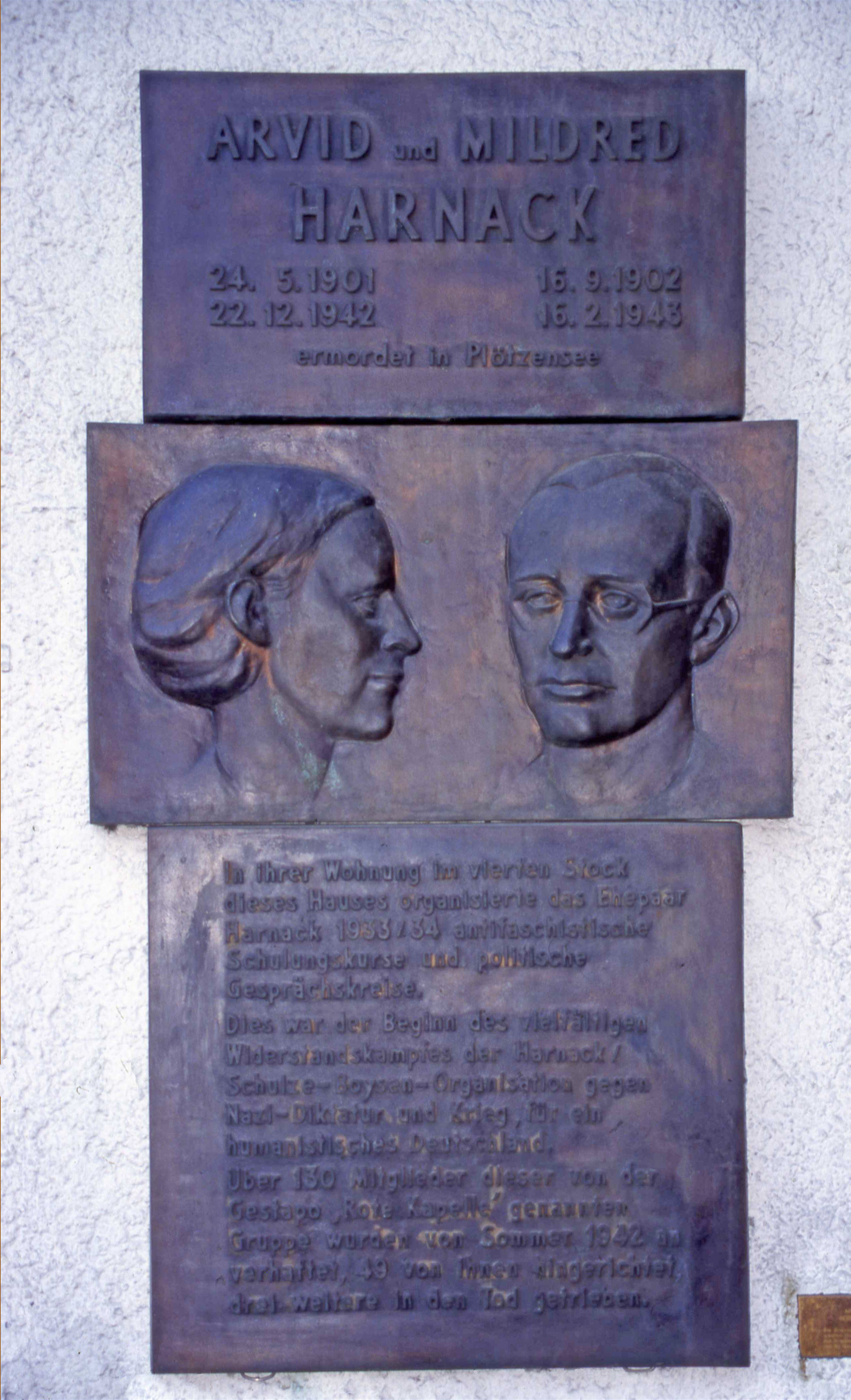
Memorial plaque for Arvid and Mildred Harnack at the Berlin building where they lived, 61 Hasenheide, Neukölln

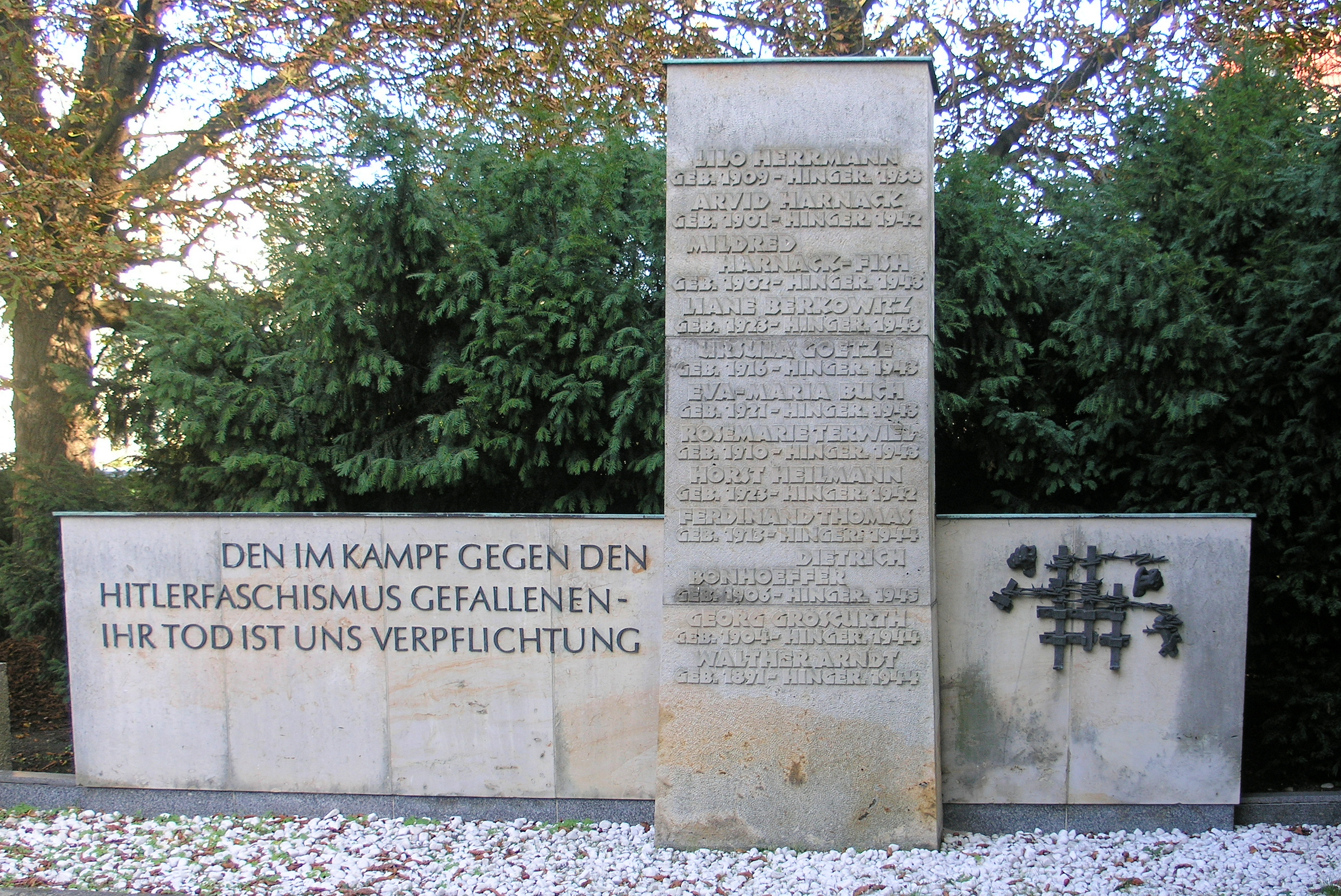
Memorial stone, "NS-Opfer" by Johanna Jura erected in 1976 at 6 Unter den Linden in Mitte

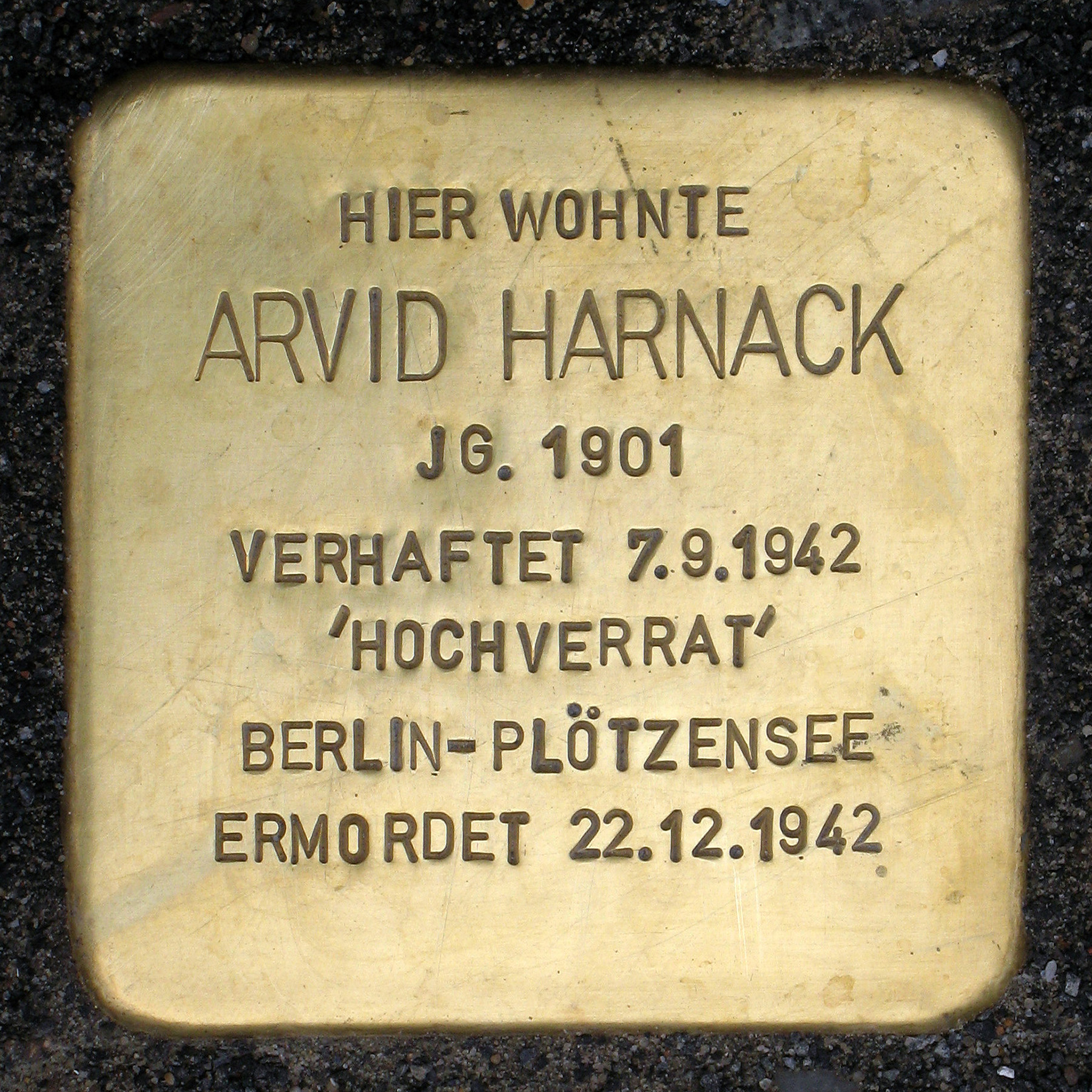
A Stolperstein for Arvid Harnack at 14 Genthiner Straße at Tiergarten

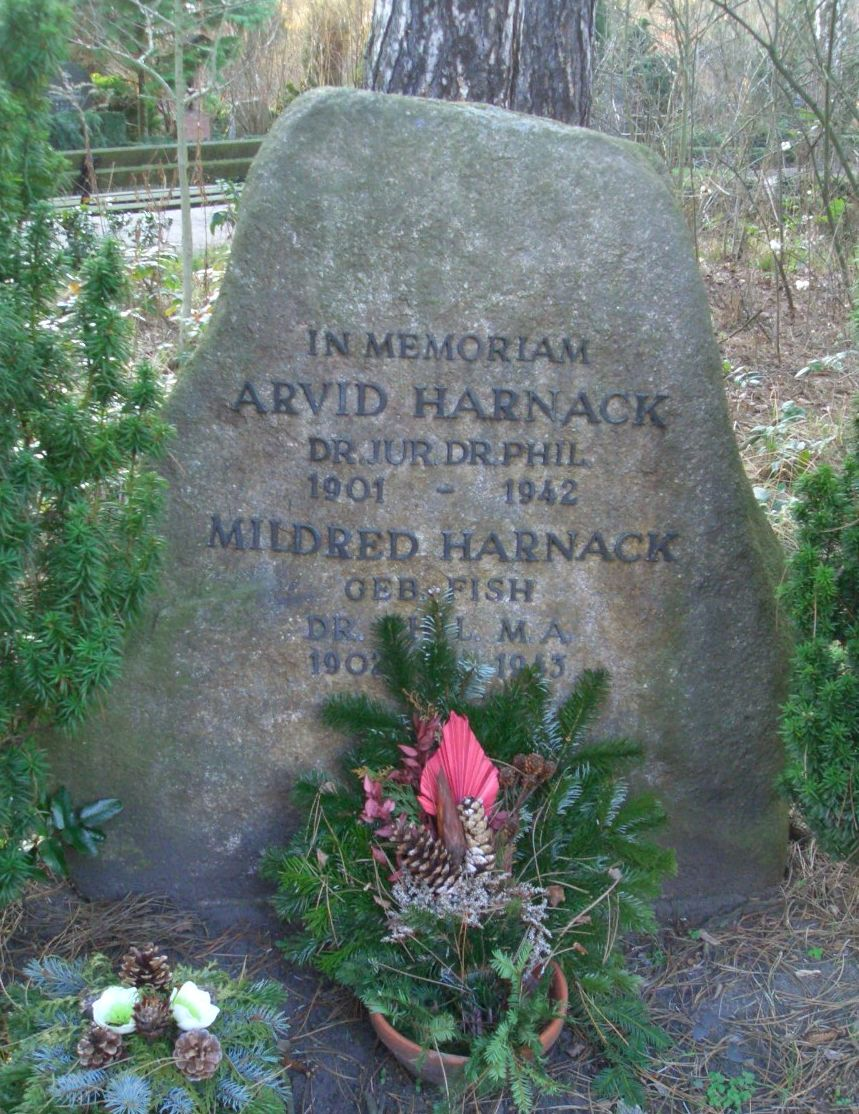
Memorial stone to Arvid and Mildred Harnack at Friedhof Zehlendorf cemetery at 33 Onkel-Tom-Straße, Berlin-Zehlendorf

== See also ==
- People of the Red Orchestra

== Bibliography ==
- Brysac, Shareen Blair (2002). Resisting Hitler: Mildred Harnack and the Red Orchestra. Oxford University Press. ISBN 978-0-19-992388-5.
- Brysac, Shareen Blair (2000). Resisting Hitler: Mildred Harnack and the Red Orchestra. New York: Oxford University Press. ISBN 978-0-19-513269-4.
- "Karl Behrens". Gedenkstätte Deutscher Widerstand (in German). German Resistance Memorial Center.
- Bruchmann, Maike (2012). "Bernhard Bästlein * 1894". Stolpersteine Hamburg (in German). Hamburg: Hamburg Stumbling Stone Initiators.
- Dallin, David J. (1955). Soviet Espionage. Yale University Press. p. 247. ISBN 978-0-598-41349-9.
- Donate, Claus (23 March 1973). "Aus den Lebenserinnerungen einer Widerstandskämpferin". 13 (in German). Zeit-Verlag Gerd Bucerius GmbH & Co. KG.
- Eckelmann, Susanne (14 September 2014). "Arvid Harnack 1901–1942". 20 Jahre Lemo. Berlin: Deutsches Historisches Museum.
- Endlich, Stefanie (2007). Wege zur Erinnerung: Gedenkstätten und -orte für die Opfer des Nationalsozialismus in Berlin und Brandenburg (in German). Landeszentrale für Politische Bildungsarbeit. ISBN 978-3-938690-45-1.
- "Arvid Harnack". Gedenkstätte Deutscher Widerstand. German Resistance Memorial Center.
- Heath, Donald Jr. (7 November 2011). Donald Heath, Jr (Vlog). Madison, Wisconsin: PBS Wisconsin University of Wisconsin-Madison.
- Hochhuth, Gerhard. "Friedrich Bodo Schlösinger". Stolpersteine in Berlin. Koordinierungsstelle Stolpersteine Berlin.
- Ihde, Jenifer (2001). "PART II. 1929–1943: Germany. 1920s & 1930s. a passion for the literary". Honoring Mildred Harnack. Memorial Library University of Wisconsin-Madison. Archived from the original on 14 August 2011.
- Jürgen, Danyel (1994). "Zwischen Nation und Sozialismus: Genese, Selbstverständnis und ordnungspolitische Vorstellungen der Widerstandsgruppe um Arvid Harnack und Harro Schulze- Boysen". In Steinbach, Peter; Tuchel, Johannes (eds.). Widerstand gegen den Nationalsozialismus. Vol. 323. Bonn: Bundeszentrale für politische Bildung.
- "Adam Kuckhoff". Gedenkstätte Deutscher Widerstand. German Resistance Memorial Center.
- Kais, Leila (2009). Das Daedalus-Prinzip: ein Diskurs zur Montage und Demontage von Ideologien : Steffen Dietzsch zum 65. Geburtstag (in German). Parerga. ISBN 978-3-937262-88-8.
- Kambas, Chryssoula; Mitsou, Marilisa (2015). Die Okkupation Griechenlands im Zweiten Weltkrieg: Griechische und deutsche Erinnerungskultur (in German). Böhlau Verlag Köln Weimar. ISBN 978-3-412-22467-7.
- Kesaris, Paul. L, ed. (1979). The Rote Kapelle: the CIA's history of Soviet intelligence and espionage networks in Western Europe, 1936–1945. Washington DC: University Publications of America. ISBN 0-89093-203-4.
- Nelson, Anne (2009). Red Orchestra. The Story of the Berlin Underground and the Circle of Friends Who Resisted Hitler. New York: Random House. ISBN 978-1-4000-6000-9.
- Kettelhake, Silke (2008). "Erzähl allen, allen von mir!" : das schöne kurze Leben der Libertas Schulze-Boysen 1913–1942 [Tell everyone, everyone about me!' – The beautiful, short life of Libertas Schulze-Boysen, 1913–1942] (in German). Münich: Droemer. ISBN 9783426274378. OCLC 221130666.
- Ohler, Norman; Mohr, Tim; Yarbrough, Marshall (2020). The Bohemians : the lovers who led Germany's resistance against the Nazis. Boston: Houghton Mifflin Harcourt. ISBN 9781328566232.
- Perrault, Gilles (1969). The Red Orchestra. New York: Schocken Books. ISBN 0805209522.
- Petrescu, Corina L. (2010). Against All Odds: Models of Subversive Spaces in National Socialist Germany. Peter Lang. ISBN 978-3-03911-845-8.
- Schultze, Harald; Kurschat, Andreas; Bendick, Claudia (2006). "Ihr Ende schaut an ...": evangelische Märtyrer des 20. Jahrhunderts (in German). Evangelische Verlagsanstalt. ISBN 978-3-374-02370-7.
- Tyas, Stephen (25 June 2017). SS-Major Horst Kopkow: From the Gestapo to British Intelligence. Fonthill Media. GGKEY:JT39J4WQW30.
- Tuchel, Johannes (1988). "Weltanschauliche Motivationen in der Harnack/Schulze-Boysen-Organisation: ("Rote Kapelle")" [Worldly motivations in the Harnack/Schulze-Boysen organization: ("Rote Kapelle")]. Kirchliche Zeitgeschichte. Theologie und Politik (in German). 1 (2). Vandenhoeck & Ruprecht (GmbH & Co. KG). JSTOR 43750615.
- West, Nigel (2007). Historical Dictionary of World War II Intelligence. Scarecrow Press. ISBN 978-0-8108-6421-4.
- Wilhelm, Gertraude (1982). "Kuckhoff, Adam". Neue Deutsche Biographie (in German). Bavarian Academy of Sciences: Historical Commission.
