= Klaus Mehnert =

German writer, academic and foreign advisor (1906–1984)

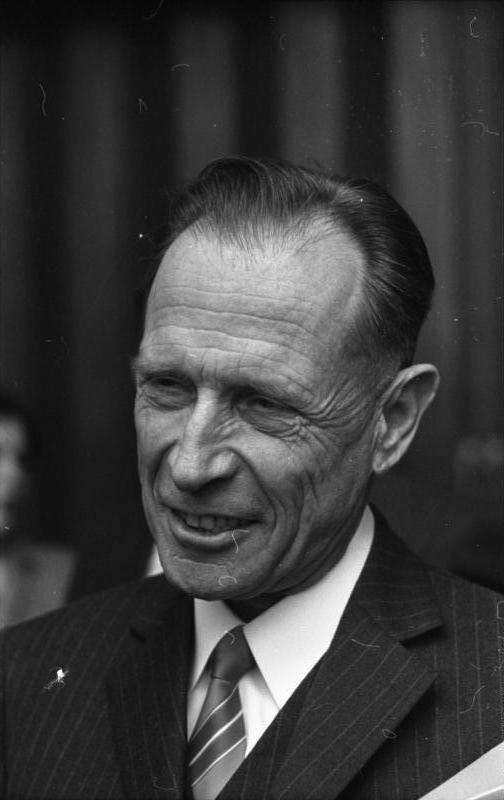
Klaus Mehnert.

Klaus Mehnert (October 10, 1906, in Moscow, Russian Empire – January 2, 1984, in Freudenstadt, West Germany) was a German writer, journalist and academic. He was a correspondent in the Soviet Union; a professor in the United States; a publisher of the German-funded journal XXth Century in Shanghai during World War II; and an advisor to several German governments after the war. He was a prolific author.

== Early life and education ==
Mehnert was born in 1906 in Moscow, Russia. His father was an engineer.

In 1914, at the outbreak of World War I, Mehnert's family left Moscow for Stuttgart, Germany. His father died in Flanders in 1917 as a German soldier. Mehnert attended the University of Tübingen and the Ludwig-Maximilians-Universität München in Germany, the University of California, Berkeley, in the United States, and finally the Friedrich Wilhelm University of Berlin, where he received his PhD under Professor Otto Hoetzsch in 1928. Hoetzsch and Mehnert later took part in the short-lived society to study the Soviet command economy, ARPLAN. Mehnert was briefly a supporter of Otto Strasser's Black Front.

== Career ==
Over the next ten years, Mehnert traveled frequently, to America, the Soviet Union, Japan, and China. He married Enid Keyes († 1955) in California in 1933. From 1934 to 1936 he served as a Soviet correspondent for a German newspaper. In 1936, he was questioned in the press court in Munich under suspicions of being too sympathetic to the Russians; although cleared by the Gestapo, he was forced out of his job. Subsequently, Mehnert moved to the United States, teaching politics at Berkeley and then at the University of Hawaii at Manoa until 1941.

=== World War II ===
In June 1941, six months prior to America's entry to World War II, he left for Shanghai, China, where he published an English-language journal named XXth Century with help from the Nazi German foreign ministry and funding from Joseph Goebbels' Third Reich Propaganda Ministry. An influential promoter of anti-Allied reports and commentary in Asia, XXth Century was later described by American intelligence as "one of the slickest bits of propaganda work that has been done anywhere". In its four years, Menhert "steered his publication cunningly along a sophisticated path that eschewed overt pro-Axis advocacy", according to the British historian Bernard Wasserstein, with "a wide range of contributors, few of whom were publicly identified with Nazism". The journal was discontinued at the end of the war in 1945, and Mehnert was briefly imprisoned.

=== Postwar ===
Mehnert returned to Germany after the war. In 1946, an American tribunal cleared him of having Nazi affiliations. He continued to face occasional accusations in the American press of spying and anti-Semitism. The German historian Norbert Frei describes Mehnert as "one of the adaptable 'former ones'" in the postwar leadership of the German newspaper Christ und Welt. Mehnert held various positions as journalist, editor, and professor. He became a foreign commentator for South German Radio in 1950. He was a professor of political science at Aachen Institute of Technology. He was the editor of the journal Osteuropa. He was a government advisor on Sino-Russian matters (counseling German chancellors from Konrad Adenauer to Helmut Schmidt). He published several books on political science. In the late 1970s he authored several books on youth movements in Western countries.

He died in 1984 at age 77 in Freudenstadt, West Germany.

Since 2005, the "Europainstitut Klaus Mehnert" has offered a student exchange program between his former university RWTH Aachen and the University of Kaliningrad.

== Selected writings ==
in German (some translated)

- Ein deutscher Austauschstudent in Kalifornien ("A German exchange student in California"). Stuttgart, 1930
- Die Jugend in Sowjet-Russland. Berlin, 1932; Youth in Soviet Russia. Transl. by Michael Davidson, Westport, Conn., 1981
- The Russians in Hawaii, 1804–19. Hawaii, 1939
- Der Sowjetmensch. Stuttgart, 1958; The Anatomy of Soviet Man. Transl. by Maurice Rosenbaum, London, 1961
- Peking und Moskau. Stuttgart, 1962; Peking and Moscow. Transl. by Leila Vennewitz, London, 1963
- China nach dem Sturm. Munich, 1971; China Today. Transl. by Cornelia Schaeffer, London, 1972. China Returns. New York, 1972.

in English

- Stalin Versus Marx: The Stalinist Historical Doctrine. London: George Allen and Unwin, 1952. 130 p.
- Soviet Man and His World. New York: Frederick A. Praeger, 1958.
- Peking and Moscow. New York: G. P. Putnam's Sons, 1963. 522 p.
- China Today. London: Thames and Hudson, 1972. 322 p. ISBN 0500250324.
- China Returns. New York: Dutton, 1972. 322 p. ISBN 978-0525080008.
- Moscow and the New Left. Berkeley & Los Angeles: University of California Press, 1975. 275 p. ISBN 978-0520026520.
- Twilight of the Young: The Radical Movements of the 1960s and Their Legacy. New York, 1977. 428 p. ISBN 978-0030194764
- Youth in Soviet Russia. Hyperion Press, 1981. ISBN 978-0830500833.
- The Russians & Their Favorite Books. Stanford, CA: Hoover Institution Press, 1983. ISBN 978-0817978211.

in German

- Peking und Moskau. DTV, 1964. 508 p.
- Der deutsche Standort. Stuttgart: Deutsche Verlags-Anstalt, 1967. 415 pp.
- China nach dem Sturm. 1971. Stuttgart: Deutsche Verlags-Anstalt, 340 pp., ISBN 978-3-421-01593-8
- Amerikanische und russische Jugend um 1930. 1973. Stuttgart: Deutsche Verlags-Anstalt, 297 pp., ISBN 978-3-421-01629-4
- Moskau und die neue Linke. 1973. 219 pp., ISBN 978-3-421-01661-4
- Jugend im Zeitbruch: Woher-Wohin. 1976. Stuttgart: Deutsche Verlags-Anstalt, 511 pp., ISBN 978-3-421-01753-6
- Kampf um Maos Erbe: Geschichten machen Geschichte. Stuttgart: Deutsche Verlags-Anstalt, 1977. 319 pp., ISBN 978-3421018250.
- Maos Erben machen's anders. 1979. Stuttgart: Deutsche Verlags-Anstalt, 171 pp.
- Ein Deutscher in der Welt: Erinnerungen 1906–1981. 1983. Stuttgart: Deutsche Verlags-Anstalt, 447 pp,. ISBN 978-3-421-06055-6
- Uber die Russen heute: Was sie lesen, wie sie sind. 1983. Stuttgart: Deutsche Verlags-Anstalt, 352 pp., ISBN 978-3-421-06163-8

in French

- La Rebelión De La Juventud. 1978.

In italian

- "Cina rossa". 1972. Milano: Bietti, 372pp.
