= Mildred Harnack =

American-German literary historian and anti-Nazi resistance operative (1902–1943)

- Born: Mildred Elizabeth Fish; September 16, 1902; Milwaukee, Wisconsin, U.S.
- Died: February 16, 1943 (aged 40); Plötzensee Prison, Berlin, Nazi Germany
- Cause of death: Execution by guillotine
- Resting place: Friedhof Zehlendorf in Berlin
- Education: University of Wisconsin; University of Jena; University of Giessen
- Occupations: Author, literary critic, resistance fighter
- Known for: Member of the Red Orchestra ("Rote Kapelle")

Mildred Elizabeth Harnack (née Fish; September 16, 1902 – February 16, 1943) was an American literary historian, translator, and member of the German resistance against the Nazi regime. After marrying Arvid Harnack, she moved to Germany in 1929, where she began her career as an academic. Mildred Harnack spent a year at the University of Jena and the University of Giessen working on her doctoral thesis. At Giessen, she witnessed the beginnings of Nazism. Mildred Harnack became an assistant lecturer in English and American literature at the University of Berlin in 1931.

In 1932, Harnack and her husband Arvid began to resist Nazism. Harnack nicknamed the underground resistance group they established "the Circle." Mildred and Arvid became friends with Louise and Donald Heath, who was First Secretary at the U.S. Embassy in Berlin, and to whom Mildred and Arvid passed intelligence from Arvid's position at the Reich Economics Ministry. Between 1935 and 1940, the couple's group intersected with three other anti-fascist resistance groups. The most important of these was run by Luftwaffe lieutenant Harro Schulze-Boysen. Like numerous groups in other parts of the world, the undercover political factions led by Harnack and Schulze-Boysen later developed into an espionage network that collaborated with Soviet intelligence to defeat Hitler. This Berlin anti-fascist espionage group "the Circle" was later named the Red Orchestra (Rote Kapelle) by the Abwehr. The couple were arrested in September 1942 and executed shortly after.

== Life ==
Mildred Elizabeth Fish was born and raised on the west side of Milwaukee, Wisconsin. Her parents were William Cook Fish, who was frequently unemployed between work as an insurance salesman, butcher, and horse trader, and Georgina Fish (née Hesketh), a self-taught stenographer and typist. Mildred had three siblings, Harriette (the eldest), and twins Marbeau (aka "Bob") and Marion. She attended West Division High School (now Milwaukee High School of the Arts). After the death of her father, Harnack and her mother moved to Chevy Chase, Maryland where Harnack's eldest sister lived. There she attended Western High School her senior year. She played on the basketball and baseball teams, served as editor for The Trailblazer, and played the role of Princess Angelica in William Makepeace Thackeray's The Rose and the Ring, the senior class play. She finished her last year at Western High School. In 1919, she began studying at George Washington University, then enrolled in 1921 at the University of Wisconsin. During her first year, she worked for the Wisconsin State Journal as a film and drama critic to support herself. She stayed at a rooming house popular with journalists and writers, but left after facing some mild prejudice, which caused her to change her major from journalism to humanities, then later to English literature. In 1922, she became a staff writer for the Wisconsin Literary Magazine.

On June 22, 1925, she was awarded a Bachelor of Arts in Humanities. Her senior thesis was "A Comparison of Chapman's and Pope's Translations of the Iliad with the Original". She stayed for further study and was awarded a Master of Arts degree in English on August 6, 1925.

While Mildred was a graduate student at the University of Wisconsin, she met Arvid Harnack, a graduate student from Germany who was studying under a Rockefeller Fellowship. After a brief love affair, they were engaged on June 6, 1926, and wed on August 7, 1926 in a ceremony at her brother's farm near the village of Brooklyn, Wisconsin. On September 28, 1928, Arvid Harnack returned to Germany. Between 1928 and 1929, Mildred Fish-Harnack taught English and American literature at Goucher College in Baltimore, Maryland.

A fellow student of Harnack's at the University of Wisconsin was Clara Leiser. A professor who exerted an influence over her was William Ellery Leonard, who advised her when she was writing her senior thesis. Leonard was a non-conformist who believed in the Emersonian principle that "nothing at last is sacred but the integrity of [one's] own mind". He subjected Fish-Harnack to a grueling scrutiny that shaped her intellectual outlook. For Fish-Harnack, Ralph Waldo Emerson and Walt Whitman were the two greatest advocates of American literature. While at Madison, the couple met Margaretha "Greta" Lorke, a German student of sociology who had been invited to study in the U.S. A lifelong friendship developed between Mildred and Greta. Lorke later married Adam Kuckhoff.

== Education ==
On June 2, 1929, Mildred moved to Jena in Germany, where she spent her first year living with the Harnack family. In the same year, she received a grant from the German Academic Exchange Service that enabled her to start working on her doctorate in American literature at the University of Jena, but she found the University of Giessen to be most welcome. Fish-Harnack's doctoral supervisor was Walther Fischer, who judged her to be an excellent lecturer and described her in a 1936 recommendation as showing great "tact", by which he meant Fish-Harnack's tactful approach to the Nazis' increasing incursion into the university in 1931 and 1932. By the time Fish-Harnack arrived in Giessen, more than half the student population were vocal in their support of the Nazis and therefore opponents of several faculty members. Amongst those under suspicion were philosophy professor Ernst von Aster—a Marxist—and economist Friedrich Lenz. Aster's wife, Swedish novelist Hildur Dixelius, became a good friend and eventually became a house guest at Fish-Harnack's Berlin house.

On February 1, 1931, Mildred Harnack began studying at the University of Berlin on a fellowship from the Alexander von Humboldt Foundation. Harnack was invited to hold a public lecture called "Romantic and Marital Love in the Work of Nathaniel Hawthorne" at the Friedrich-Wilhelm University, which allowed her to work as an assistant lecturer and lector on English and American literature. She taught courses on Emerson, Whitman, Theodore Dreiser, Sinclair Lewis, Thomas Hardy, and George Bernard Shaw. Mildred Harnack was popular with her students and over three semesters enrollment in the course tripled.

Harnack was an active member of the American expatriate community in Berlin. She went to dances at the American Student Association and was a member of the American Women's Club in Bellevuestraße, later serving as its president. The Harnacks socialized with American journalists and diplomats at the American Church in Nollendorfplatz, a popular meeting place for American ex-pats.

== Career ==
During their time in Berlin, the Harnacks witnessed the Weimardämmerung, the unraveling of the German republic. They became interested in the Soviet Union and communism, seeing them as a solution to the rampant poverty and unemployment that Germany suffered during the Great Depression. They were of particular interest for Harnack, whose mother had struggled during the hyperinflation of the 1920s after the loss of her husband when he was a teenager. Their interest in capitalism waned, and they both believed that the economic system was ideologically bankrupt; they looked to the Soviet Union's new experimental five-year plans, believing the system could provide work for the masses. In 1931, Arvid established the Wissenschaftliche Arbeitsgemeinschaft zum Studium der sowjetischen Planwirtschaft (ARPLAN, "Scientific Working Community for the Study of the Soviet Planned Economy"), a group of writers and academics that met once a month to discuss the Soviet planned economy.

In 1932, Fish-Harnack lost her position as a lecturer in American literature at the University of Berlin. At the time, the German Americanist and ardent Nazi Friedrich Schönemann had returned from leave in America to work in the English department. Fish-Harnack never hid her leftist political views during lectures. In May 1932, the funding that enabled Mildred to teach at Friedrich-Wilhelm University was canceled. The couple was forced to move to 61 Hasenheide in Neukölln due to the Nazis' presence. The couple had leased the apartment from a relative of the writer Stefan Heym; in his postwar novel Nachruf, Heym stated he found the Harnacks to be a genial academic couple with a determined outlook on the Nazis.

In the same year, Soviet economist and diplomat Sergei Bessonov, with the help of the Soviet embassy, organized a three-week study trip (from August 20 to September 12, 1932) to the Soviet Union for 23 members of ARPLAN including Arvid. Mildred hoped to go, but due to a scheduling conflict decided to make her own way there by booking the trip using Intourist and flying back early. Fish-Harnack's career as a scholar was saved when a family friend who was also president of American Student Union, Warren Tomlinson, suggested she take over his position as lecturer at the Berlin municipal evening high school. On September 1, 1932, Fish-Harnack began lecturing at the Heil'schen Abendschule Abendgymnasium ("Berliner Städtische Abendgymnasium für Erwachsene" or BAG) at Berlin W 50, Augsburger Straße 60 in Schöneberg, an evening high school for adults to prepare for the Abitur. Fish-Harnack was popular with her students, for many of whom her courses were their first introduction to American Literature. She socialised with her students and discussed economic and political ideas from the United States and the Soviet Union in an open and frank manner. One of her students, Karl Behrens, became friends with the Harnacks and eventually one of their most ardent recruits.

During the 1930s, the Harnacks kept in close contact with the Bonhoeffer family. Fish-Harnack, seeking additional income, launched a lecture series that was held in Klaus and Emmi Bonhoeffer's home.

On June 13, 1933, Fish-Harnack met Martha Dodd when she and other members of the American Women's Club met at the Lehrter train station to welcome Dodd's father and American ambassador, William. Dodd became Fish-Harnack's friend in Berlin, and her manuscript, In Memory, found in her Prague apartment attic in 1957, stated:

The years of our acquaintance were the most significant of my life. Our work, our experiences, in these courageous tragic years of fulfillment and disappointment are closely interwoven. Everything we thought about. What we loved. Hated. What we fought for. We shared with each other. We, all of us, my husband were in the German underground from 1933 to 1943. I'm the only one left.

In a letter Fish-Harnack wrote to her mother in October 1935, she described Dodd as a talented writer of literary criticism and short stories with "a real desire to understand the wider world... Therefore, our interests combine and we will try to work something out together." Fish-Harnack and Dodd edited a book column together in the English-language newspaper Berlin Topics. The Harnacks began to host a Saturday literary salon on Hasenheide where political views among editors, publishers, and authors were freely expressed; the attendees included publishers Samuel Fischer, Ernst Rowohlt, and Rowohlt's son Heinrich Marie Ledig-Rowohlt; translator Franz Frein; physician and writer Max Mohr; authors and playwrights Adam Kuckhoff, Max Tau, Otto Zoff, and Ernst von Salomon; journalist Margret Boveri; critic Erich Franzen; and Mildred's students, such as writer Friedrich Schlösinger. In Dodd's book Through Embassy Eyes, she mentioned a report by an American publisher who had visited the Fish-Harnacks in 1934, who stated:

He was expecting a lively exchange of views and engaging conversations that evening—definitely more appealing than that to which we were used in diplomatic circles. Instead, I only saw suffering and need. People whose spirit was broken. I saw pathetic cowardice. A lying in wait and tension, which was triggered by the visits by the secret police. The last of the meager remnants of free thought.

In 1934, the couple moved to the third floor apartment at 16 Schöneberger Woyrschstraße, close to the Tiergarten. The house was destroyed in the war and is now known as 14 Genthiner Straße.

=== Literary figure ===
An important writer in Fish-Harnack's life was Thomas Wolfe. She found that his ability to shape memories from his early life to produce an autobiographical novel was reflected in her own desires for her own novel. She had read Wolfe's first book, Look Homeward, Angel, in 1933, lectured on the writer at the American Women's Club in 1933, and produced a further lecture in 1934 that was presented at the Bonhoeffers'. On August 5, 1934, Fish-Harnack published the essay "Drei junge Dichter aus USA. Thornton Wilder, Thomas Wolfe, William Faulkner" in the Berliner Tageblatt. On May 8, 1935, the Harnacks attended the American embassy in Berlin for tea, along with the Kuckhoffs. Fish-Harnack had a rare chance to meet Wolfe, who came to Germany to promote his book with his publisher, Ledig-Rowohlt. The tea party was also attended by John Sieg. Tau, a Jewish German-Norwegian writer and close friend of the Harnacks who attended the tea party, had to leave Germany after Kristallnacht; it is unclear which of the Harnacks organised his escape.

In the mid-1930s, Fish-Harnack's work began to be noticed and she became a published writer. In 1934, Fish-Harnack wrote an essay, "The Epic of the South", which was published in Berliner Tageblatt. In 1935, she wrote an essay, "Ein amerikanischer Dichter aus großer Tradition" (transl. "An American poet of a greater Tradition"), on William Faulkner for the magazine Die Literatur. This type of critical analysis was no longer tolerated and could have ended her teaching career. On May 27, 1934, Fish-Harnack accepted an invitation from Ledig-Rowohlt, Dodd, and Dodd's boyfriend Boris Vinogradov to visit the German writer Hans Fallada in Carwitz, whose book Little Man, What Now? was published the previous year in the USA and had been a bestseller. Fallada was one of the few German writers who failed to obey the Nazi state. After 1935, Fish-Harnack did not publish any literary criticisms, essays, or newspaper articles, as the increasing presence of the Nazi regime made any writings a "rubber stamp for official views".

In 1936, her German translation of Irving Stone's biography of Vincent van Gogh, Lust for Life, was published. She continued to work as a translator for publishing houses. In January 1937, Fish-Harnack visited the United States, and stayed with Leiser in New York for two weeks, which was the last time that Leiser saw Fish-Harnack. Leiser found Fish-Harnack changed, from the open and trusting person she had known into someone who seemed distant and superior, a side-effect of the deceit necessary to hide her true feelings in Germany. Fish-Harnack's high school friend Mady Emmerling found Fish-Harnack to be overly cautious, frightened, and reserved, all indicative of having lived in the Nazi state for four years. Fish-Harnack had become used to assuming a persona, or passing, to fool the Nazi state. Many of her friends assumed from her bearing that she had become a Nazi. Immediately after staying with Leiser, Fish-Harnack went on a campus lecture tour that included Haverford College, New York University, University of Chicago, and University of Wisconsin, whose theme was "The German Relation to Current American Literature". Leonard attended the lecture at Madison and was unwilling to endorse Fish-Harnack's lecture when she asked for a written recommendation. However, at Haverford, Douglas V. Steere, who did not know her, found her presentation to be "vivid and full of charm". She visited her relatives during the tour and left in the spring to return to Berlin.

Later in 1938, Fish-Harnack worked on her doctoral dissertation, entitled "Die Entwicklung der amerikanischen Literatur der Gegenwart in einigen Hauptvertretern des Romans und der Kurzgeschicht" (transl. "The development of contemporary American literature in some of the main representatives of the novel and the short story"), and was awarded her doctorate at the University of Giessen on November 20, 1941. In 1938 she received a job offer from the Rütten & Loening publishing house in Berlin as a consultant for American novels. The same year, Fish-Harnack joined the Daughters of the American Revolution and became a local representative in Berlin. In October 1939, she applied for the Guggenheim and Rockefeller fellowships but was refused. In 1941 she was hired as an English-language professor at the Foreign Studies Department of the Friedrich Wilhelm University, which was run by SS Major Franz Six.

=== Resistance ===
Leading up to and during the war, Red Orchestra tried to recruit new members, which was difficult due to the ratio of informers to proper recruits in the general populace. The group devised a method to vet potential recruits that would start with inviting them to a meeting, with the approach of making the potential recruit believe the group were Nazis, and lead the person to reveal their political attitude to Nazism through conversation. Harnack lent books to the potential recruit as a test of their intellect, as there was little chance of winning such people over if they did not understand politics. At one meeting, Fish-Harnack held a lecture on Kim by Rudyard Kipling to help the recruits understand colonialism.

On March 3, 1938, William Dodd was replaced by Hugh Wilson. Joining him as First Secretary and monetary attaché at the U.S. Embassy was Donald Heath. In 1937, Fish-Harnack met Louise Heath, Donald Heath's wife, at the American Women's Club in Bellevuestraße. The Harnacks became friends with the Heaths. When the war started the Heaths fled to Norway, but when they returned, Louise requested that Fish-Harnack tutor her son, Donald Heath, Jr., in American literature. The two couples spent weekends and occasional holidays together. At times Harnack and Donald would meet in the countryside to exchange intelligence, but it became increasingly dangerous. Between December 1939 and March 1941, Donald Jr., couriered between Fish-Harnack and the U.S. Embassy in Berlin.

During the 1930s, the Harnacks came into contact with other resistance groups and began to cooperate with them. The most important of these was a group run by Harro Schulze-Boysen, a Luftwaffe lieutenant and descendant of an old German military family who had known Harnack since 1935, but was reintroduced to him sometime in late 1939 or early 1940 through Greta Kuckhoff; the Kuckhoffs had known the Schulz-Boysens since 1938 and started to engage them socially in late 1939 or early 1940 by bringing Fish-Harnack and Libertas Schulze-Boysen together while on holiday in Saxony. Of the meeting Greta Kuckhoff wrote,

I saw it clearly before my eyes. From then on our work not only implies the risk of losing our freedom, from now on death was a possibility.

Harro and Libertas were part of a bohemian group of friends that met twice a month in fun meetings in contrast to the Harnacks' austere study meetings. The initial meeting of the women gave rise to a licentious image of the group that persisted for decades after the war, based primarily on Gestapo and Abwehr reports. In his 1967 book, L'orchestre rouge, Gilles Perrault states that Fish-Harnack and Libertas were lesbians. However, industrialist Hugo Buschmann, who was an informant and Harro's close friend, stated that the group lived dangerously, but there was no evidence for Perrault's conclusion.

On September 17, 1940, the Harnacks met the third secretary member of the Soviet embassy, Alexander Korotkov, and Arvid Harnack decided to resume passing classified information about Hitler's regime to the Soviet Union in order to undermine it. According to lawyer Wolfgang Havemann, from that point forward Fish-Harnack endured a persistent fear of being discovered.

== Discovery ==
The discovery of illegal radio transmissions by the German radio counterintelligence organization Funkabwehr in 1942 eventually revealed the members of the group and led to the Harnacks' arrest. The exposure of the radio codes enabled Referat 12, the cipher bureau of the Funkabwehr that had been tracking Red Orchestra radio transmissions since June 1941, to decipher Red Orchestra message traffic. Wenzel's apartment in Brussels was found to contain a large number of coded messages. When Wilhelm Vauck, principal cryptographer of the Funkabwehr, received the ciphers from Wenzel, he was able to decipher some of the older messages. On 15 July 1942, Vauck decrypted a message dated 10 October 1941 that gave the locations of the Kuckhoffs' and Schulze-Boysens' apartments.

== Arrest and death ==
On September 7, 1942, the Harnacks were arrested by the Gestapo in Nazi-occupied Lithuania at the seaside village of Preila on the Curonian Spit.

On December 19, after a four-day trial before the Reichskriegsgericht ("Reich Military Tribunal"), Mildred Harnack was initially sentenced to six years in prison, but Adolf Hitler refused to endorse the sentence and ordered a new trial, which resulted in a death sentence on January 16, 1943. She was beheaded by guillotine on February 16, 1943. While she was imprisoned, Fish-Harnack translated the poem Vermächtnis (transl. "Bequest") by Johann Wolfgang von Goethe. Her last words were purported to have been "Und ich habe Deutschland auch so geliebt" ("And I, too, so loved Germany"). She was the only American executed on the direct orders of Adolf Hitler.

After her execution, her body was released to the Charité Anatomical Institute and Humboldt University anatomy professor Hermann Stieve to be dissected for his research into the effects of stress, caused by awaiting execution, on the menstrual cycle. After he was finished, he gave what was left to a friend of hers, who had the remains buried in Berlin's Zehlendorf Cemetery. She is the only member of the Berlin-based anti-Nazis whose burial site is known.

When she learned of the execution, Clara Leiser wrote the unfinished poem "To and from the guillotine" in remembrance of her friend.

Arvid's brother Falk Harnack, also a resistance fighter, was able to escape and survived the Second World War as an ELAS partisan in Greece.

In 2021, Canadian-born writer Rebecca Donner published in 2021 a book "All the Frequent Troubles of Our Days: The True Story of the American Woman at the Heart of the German Resistance to Hitler" on Harnack’s life. Donner who is the great-niece of Mildred Harnack wrote the book largely on information taken from the letters that her grandmother had given her when she was sixteen, with the aim of making a book out of them.

== U.S. government response ==
While newspapers learned about the execution shortly after the war, the U.S. government concealed additional information about Harnack's story. The Counterintelligence Corps (CIC) of the U.S. Army began to investigate her execution as a possible war crime. They acknowledged her work leading a large group secretly fighting the Nazi regime and described her actions as "laudable". However, investigators concluded that since Harnack was actually guilty of espionage and had received a trial, her execution did not constitute a violation of international law. The case was closed.

== Gallery ==
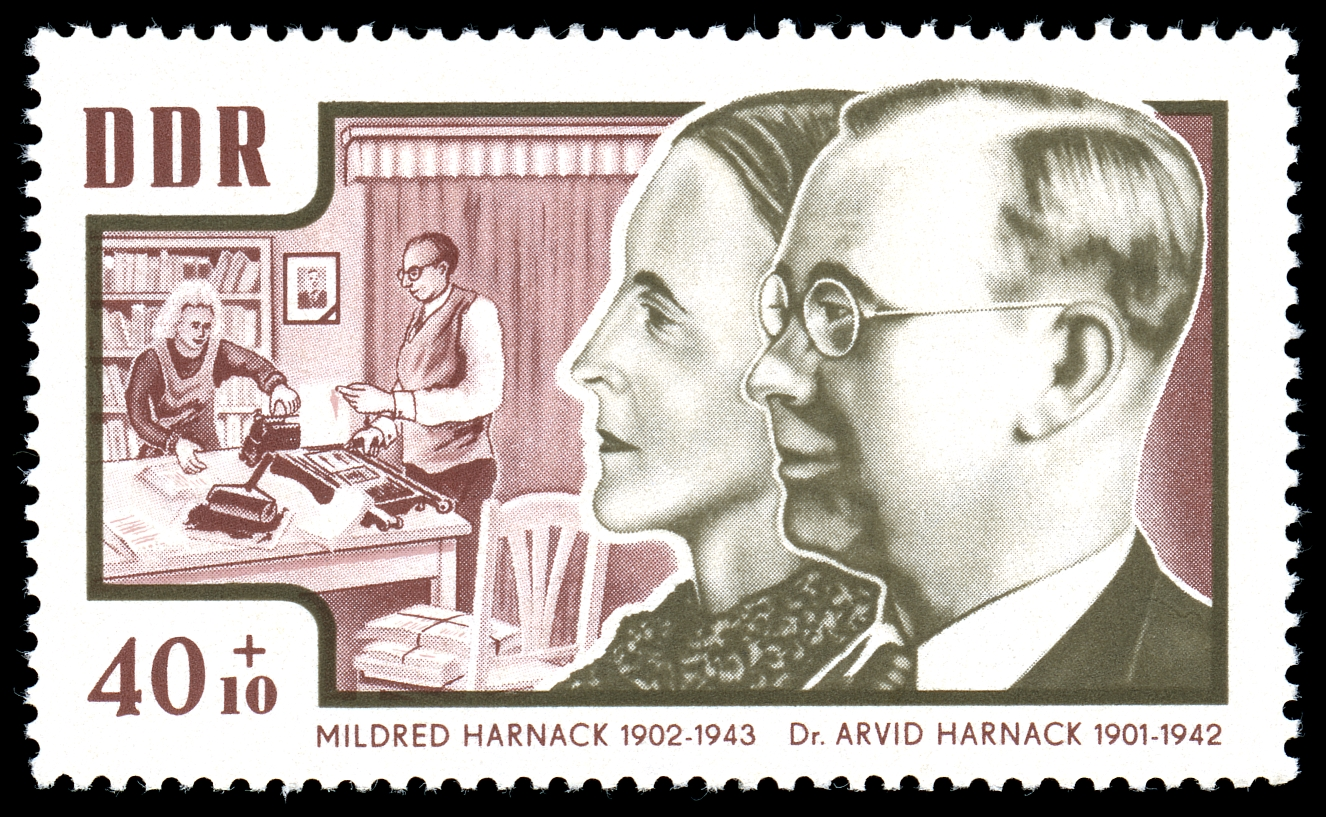
Commemorative stamp honouring Mildred Harnack and her husband Arvid issued by the Deutsche Post of the GDR in 1964

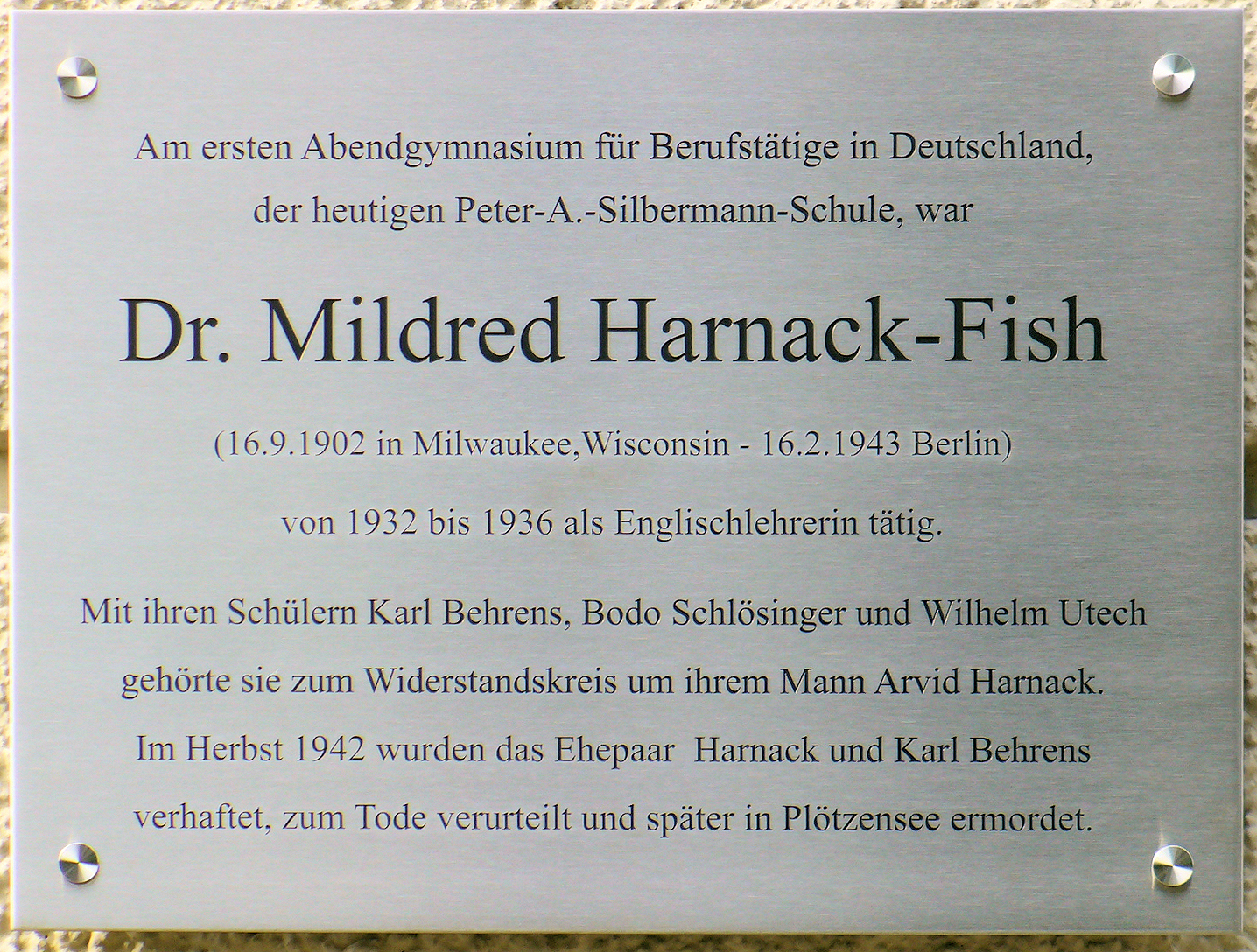
Commemorative plaque at the Peter A. Silbermann School/Friedrich Ebert Secondary School in Berlin-Wilmersdorf

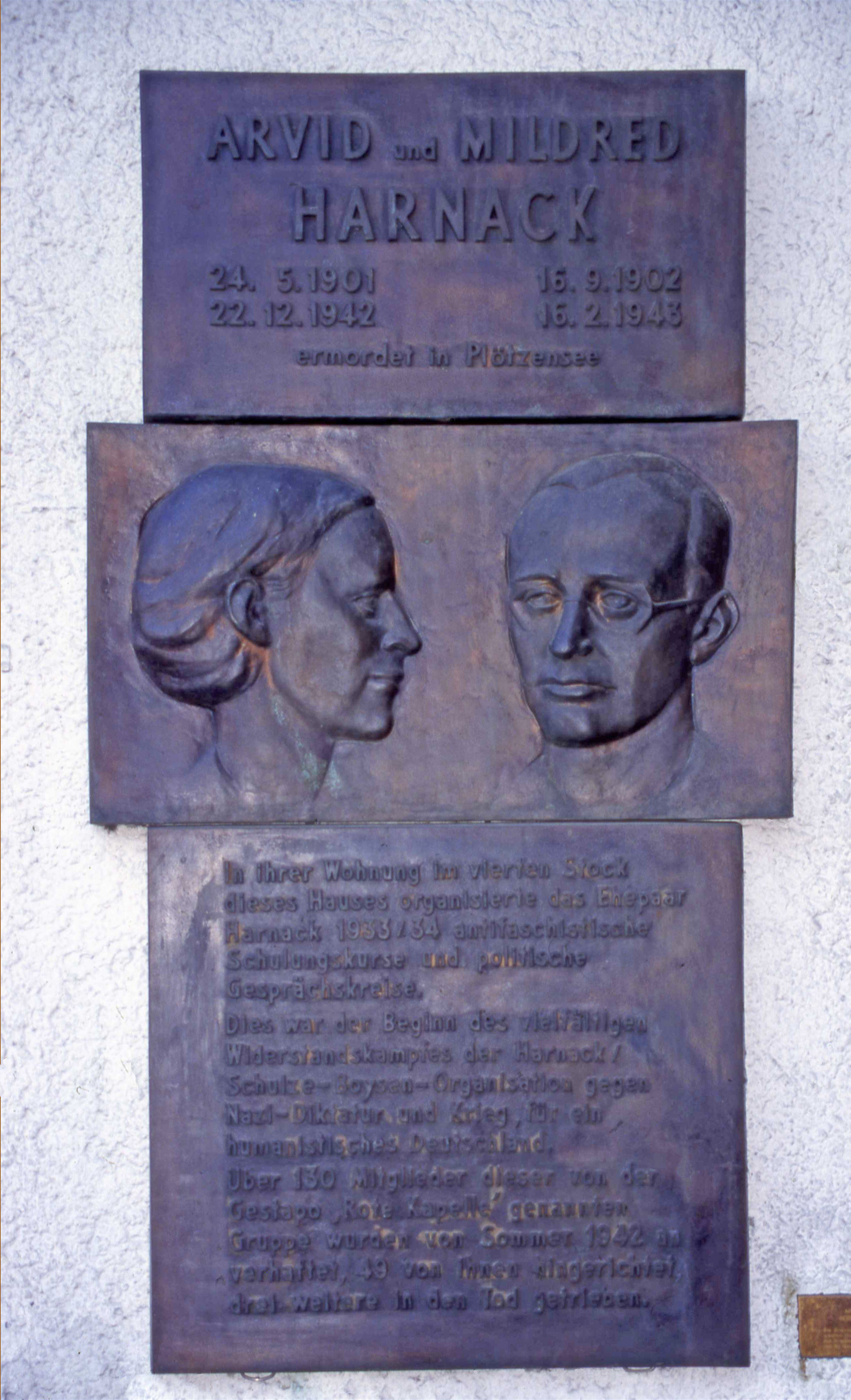
Memorial plaque at the Berlin building where the Harnacks lived, 61 Hasenheide, Berlin-Neukölln

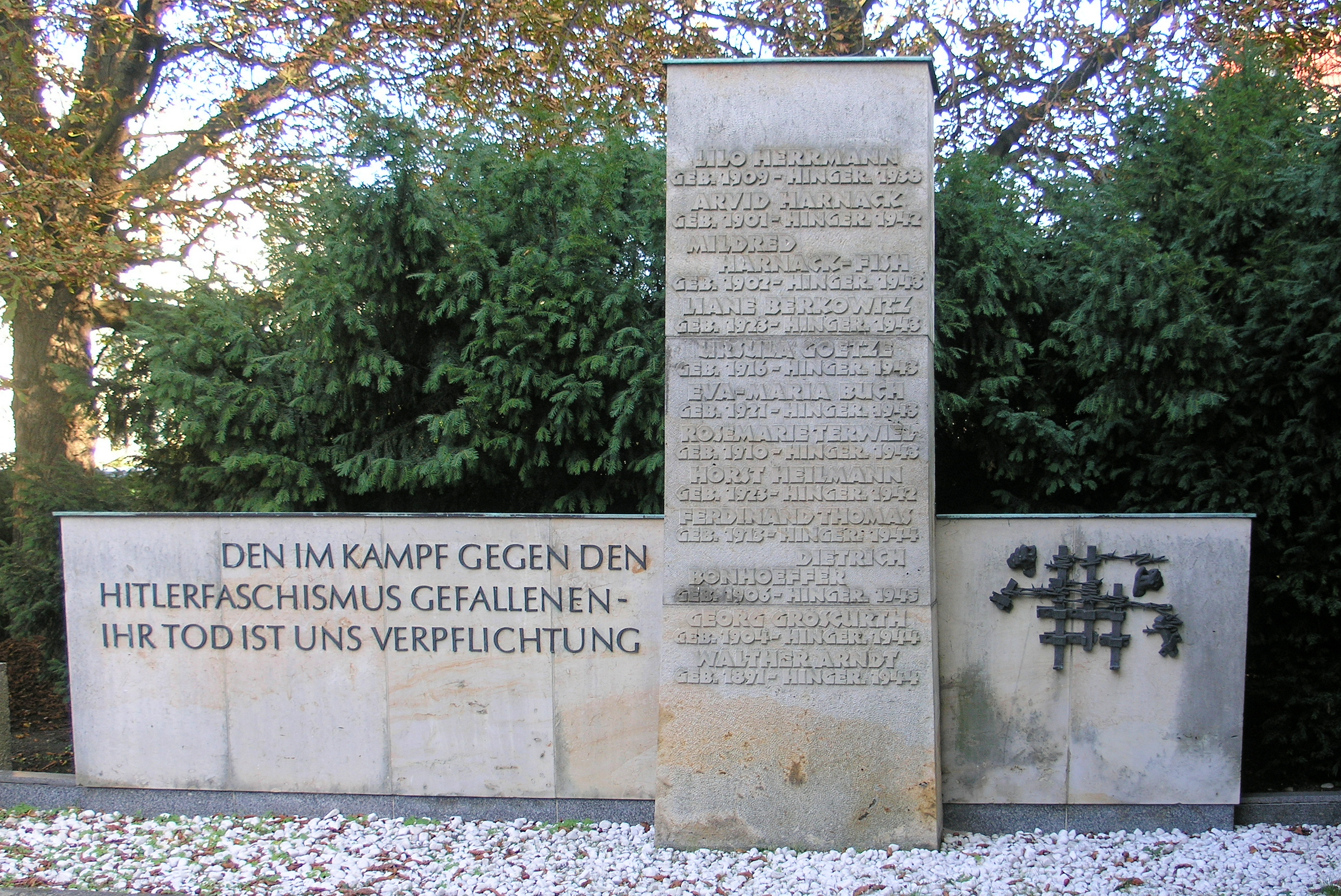
Memorial to victims of fascism affiliated with the Humboldt University, 6 Unter den Linden, in Berlin-Mitte

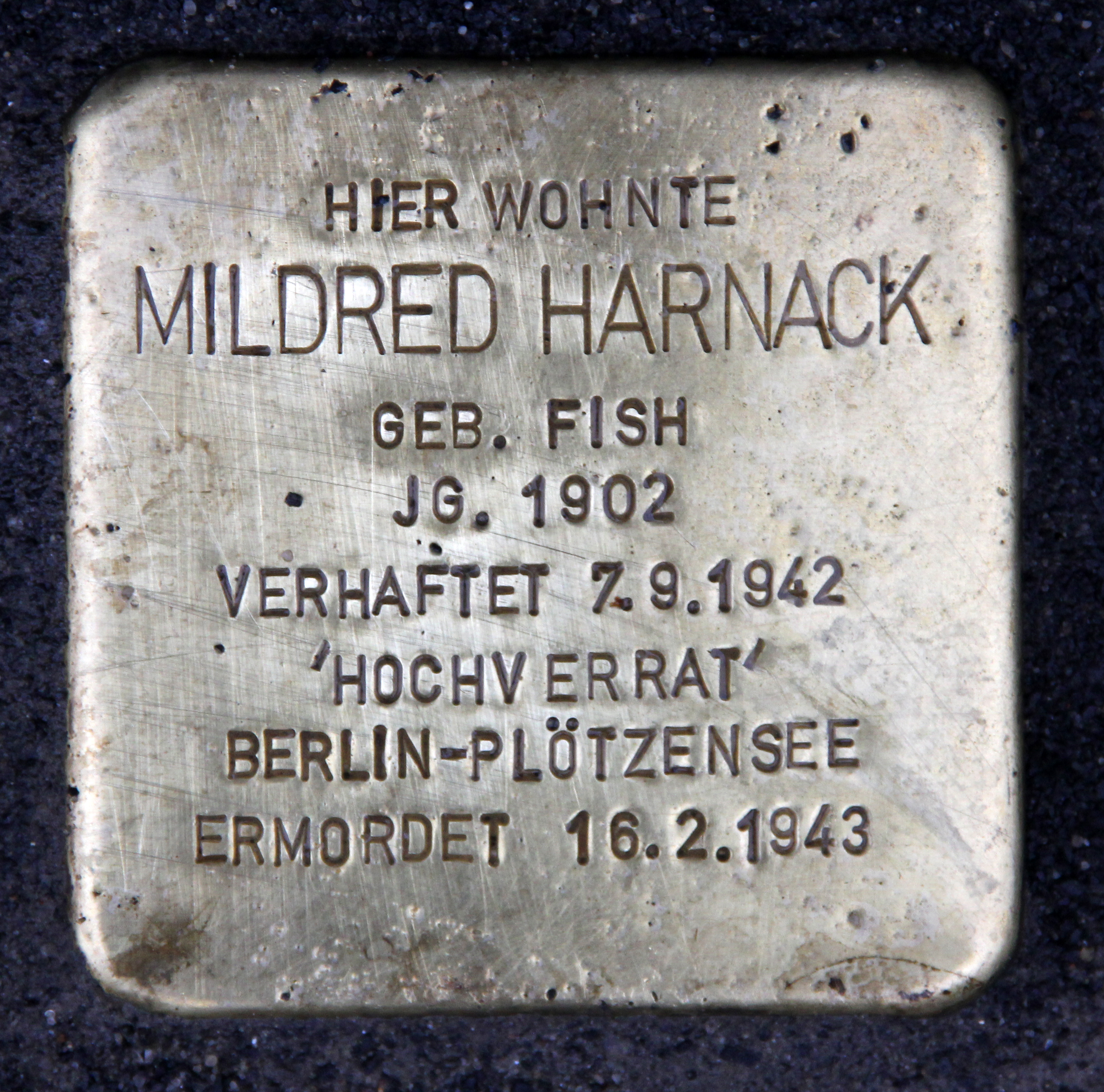
A Stolperstein for Mildred Harnack at 14 Genthiner Strasse, Berlin-Tiergarten

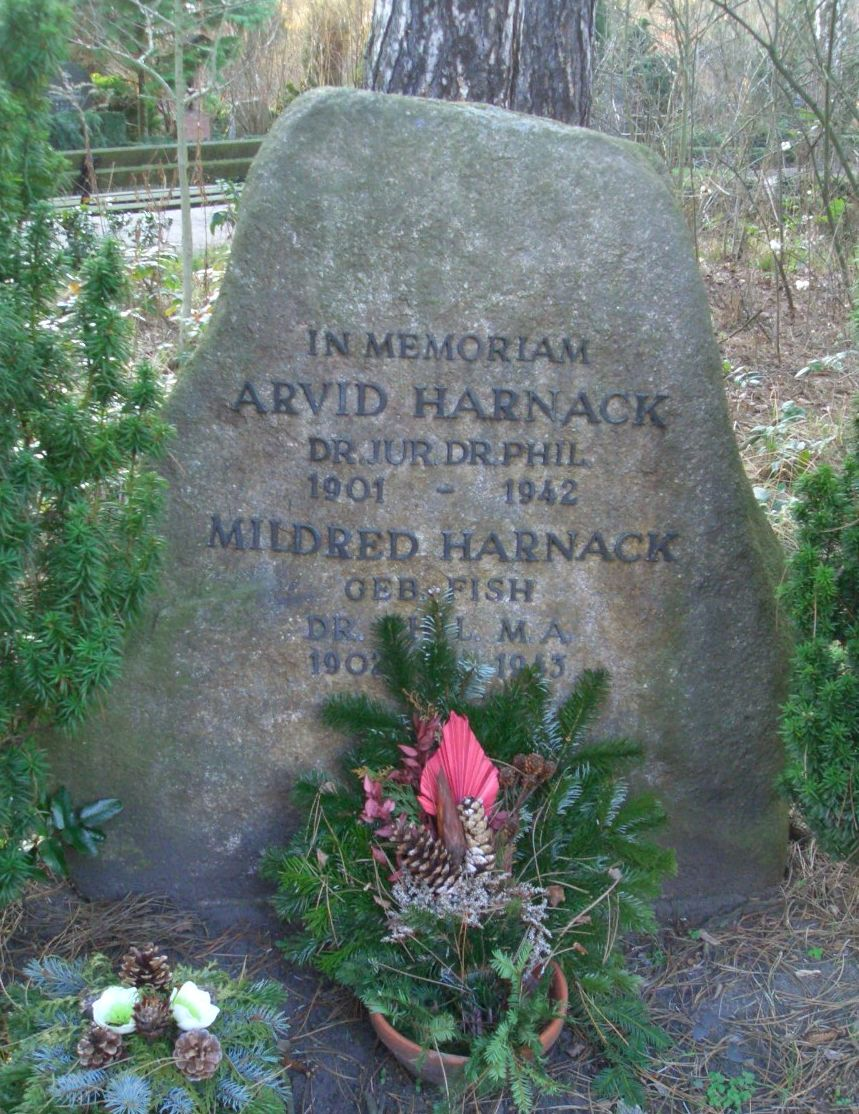
Memorial stone at Friedhof Zehlendorf at 33 Onkel-Tom-Strasse, Berlin-Zehlendorf

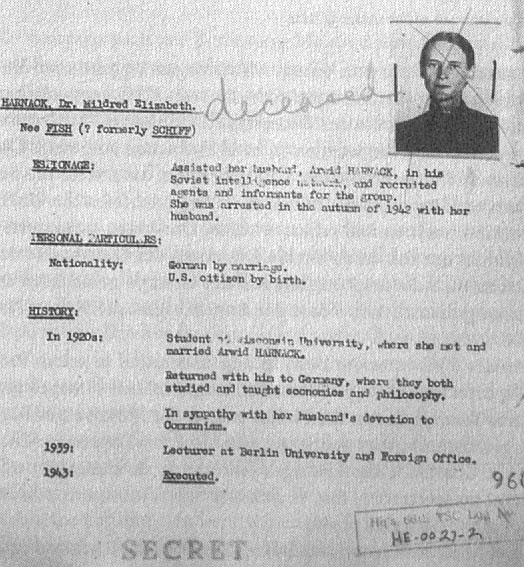
Counter Intelligence Corps file ref. Mildred Harnack (about 1947)

== Memorials ==
- A cenotaph for the Harnacks stands in the Zehlendorf cemetery in Berlin, Germany.
- Mildred Fish Harnack Day is observed by schools in the U.S. state of Wisconsin.
- In 2006, a street in Berlin's Friedrichshain neighborhood was renamed Mildred Harnack Street (Mildred-Harnack-Straße)
- A school named in honor of Harnack in Berlin is located on Schulze-Boysen-Straße, a street named for fellow members of the Red Orchestra, Libertas and Harro Schulze-Boysen.
- A public school complex in her hometown of Milwaukee was named in honor of Mildred Fish-Harnack in 2013.
- Mildred's alma mater, the University of Wisconsin-Madison, hosts the annual Mildred Fish-Harnack Human Rights and Democracy Lecture in her memory, which was established in 1994.
- In 2019, the city of Madison, Wisconsin, dedicated a sculpture honoring Harnack by titled, "Mildred" by John Durbrow in Madison's Marshall Park.
- On September 15, 2021, an identical copy of the sculpture "Mildred" by John Durbrow was dedicated at Justis Leibig University (Giessen, Hesse, Germany), where Harnack received her PhD.
- In 2013, Stolpersteins for the Harnacks were laid in front of 14 Genthiner Straße in the Tiergarten, Berlin, on September 20.

== Works ==
- Harnack, Mildred (1935). "Ein amerikanischer Dichter aus großer Tradition". Die Literatur. 38: 64–67.
- Harnack, Mildred (1941). Die Entwicklung der amerikanischen Literatur der Gegenwart in einigen Hauptvertretern des Romans und der Kurzgeschichte [The Development of Contemporary American Literature with some Main Representatives of the Novel and Short Story] (Ph.D. thesis). Gießen: Philosophische Fakultät der Ludwigs-Universität zu Gießen.
- Harnack, Mildred (1988). Variationen über das Thema Amerika: Studien zur Literatur der USA. Berlin: Aufbau.

=== Translations ===
- Stone, Irving (1936), Vincent van Gogh. Ein Leben in Leidenschaft [Lust for Life], Berlin: Universitas.
- Edmonds, Walter D. (1938), Pfauenfeder und Kokarde [Drums along the Mohawk], Berlin: Universitas.

== See also ==
- Martha Dodd
- William E. Dodd
- Bella Fromm
- Erik Larson, In the Garden of Beasts: Love, Terror, and an American Family in Hitler's Berlin (2011)
- People of the Red Orchestra

== Bibliography ==
- Arnold, Maren; Destanovic, Edis; Geißler, Marc; Hoffmann, Sandra; Stephan, Roswitha; Weiß, Christian (2017). "Kapitel 3: Mildred Harnack". In Juchler, Ingo (ed.). Mildred Fish-Harnack und die Rote Kapelle in Berlin (in German) (1st ed.). Potsdam: Universitätsverlag Potsdam. ISBN 978-3-86956-407-4.
- Barr, Alfred H. (February 1967). Vincent Van Gogh. Psychology Press. ISBN 978-0-7146-2039-8.
- Balla-Cayard, L. (November 1952). "German Dissertations on American Literature Accepted between 1900 and 1945". American Literature. 24 (3). Duke University Press: 84–390. JSTOR 2921357.
- Beck, Earl R. (1964). "Friedrich Schönemann, German Americanist". The Historian. 26 (3): 381–404. doi:10.1111/j.1540-6563.1964.tb00255.x. JSTOR 244414.
- Bazelon, Emily (7 November 2013). "What Happened to the Remains of Nazi Resister Mildred Harnack? Now We Know". Slate.
- Brands, Jere (27 September 2010). "Biographical Timelines: Mildred Fish and Arvid Harnack". Traces. Archived from the original on 27 September 2010.
- Brysac, Shareen Blair (2000). Resisting Hitler: Mildred Harnack and the Red Orchestra. New York: Oxford University Press. ISBN 978-0-19-513269-4.
- Brysac, Shareen Blair (23 May 2002). Resisting Hitler: Mildred Harnack and the Red Orchestra. Oxford University Press. ISBN 978-0-19-992388-5.
- Bucher, Chris (16 February 2015). "Wisconsin Public School Observance Days : 2020–21". Wisconsin Department of Public Instruction. Wisconsin Department of Public Instruction News Room.
- Donate, Claus (23 March 1973). "Aus den Lebenserinnerungen einer Widerstandskämpferin". 13 (in German). Zeit-Verlag Gerd Bucerius GmbH & Co. KG. Die Zeit.
- Donner, Rebecca (2021). All the Frequent Troubles of Our Days: The True Story of the American Woman at the Heart of the German Resistance to Hitler. New York: Little, Brown and Company. ISBN 978-0-316-56169-3.
- Endlich, Stefani (2007). Wege zur Erinnerung: Gedenkstätten und -orte für die Opfer des Nationalsozialismus in Berlin und Brandenburg (in German). Landeszentrale für Politische Bildungsarbeit. ISBN 978-3-938690-45-1.
- Fox, Jo (2004). Brysac, Shareen Blair; Galante, Pierre; Silianoff, Eugène; Howson, Mark; Ryan, Cary; Johnson, David Alan; Kershaw, Ian; Kochavi, Arieh J.; Shatzkes, Pamela (eds.). "Resistance and the Third Reich". Journal of Contemporary History. 39 (2): 271–283. doi:10.1177/0022009404042125. ISSN 0022-0094. JSTOR 3180725.
- Grünberg, Uwe; Nadol, Dominic; Pürschel, Tobias; Wiecking, Ole (2017). "Kapitel 4: Karl Behrens". In Juchler, Ingo (ed.). Mildred Harnack und die Rote Kapelle in Berlin (PDF). Potsdam: Universitätsverlag Potsdam. ISBN 978-3-86956-407-4.
- Heath, Donald Jr. (7 November 2011). Donald Heath, Jr (Vlog). Madison, Wisconsin: PBS Wisconsin.
- Horne, Michael (27 February 2013). "Plenty of Horne: Name MPS School After Anti-Nazi Hero?". Urban Milwaukee.
- Ihde, Jennifer (2001). "Late 1940s, a friend's poem". Honoring Mildred Fish Harnack. University of Wisconsin. Archived from the original on 14 August 2011.
- Juchler, Ingo, ed. (2017a). "Einführung: Mildred Harnack – Mittlerin der amerikanischen Literatur und Widerstandkämpferin". Mildred Fish-Harnack und die Rote Kapelle in Berlin (in German) (1st ed.). Potsdam: Universitätsverlag Potsdam. ISBN 978-3-86956-407-4.
- Juchler, Ingo (2017). Mildred Harnack und die Rote Kapelle in Berlin (1st ed.). Potsdam: Universitätsverlag Potsdam. ISBN 978-3-86956-407-4.
- Kesaris, Paul. L, ed. (1979). The Rote Kapelle: the CIA's history of Soviet intelligence and espionage networks in Western Europe, 1936–1945. Washington DC: University Publications of America. ISBN 978-0-89093-203-2.
- Knutson, Käri (11 July 2019). "Mildred Fish-Harnack honored as hero of resistance to Nazi regime". University of Wisconsin–Madison News.
- Lombardi, Anna (11 October 2023). "Rebecca Donner: la mia prozia che spiava contro Hitler" [(Interview) Rebecca Donner: My great-great-aunt was a spy who fought against Hitler]. Il Venerdì di Repubblica (in Italian).
- Nagorski, Andrew (13 March 2012). Hitlerland: American Eyewitnesses to the Nazi Rise to Power. Simon and Schuster. ISBN 978-1-4391-9100-2.
- Nelson, Anne (2009). Red Orchestra: The Story of the Berlin Underground and the Circle of Friends Who Resisted Hitler. New York: Random House. ISBN 978-1-4000-6000-9.
- Nicolaisen, Peter; Göske, Daniel (2008). "William Faulkner in Germany: A Survey". The Faulkner Journal. 24 (1). The Johns Hopkins University Press: 63–81. doi:10.1353/fau.2008.0003. JSTOR 24908336. S2CID 165465035.
- Ohler, Norman; Mohr, Tim; Yarbrough, Marshall (14 July 2020). The Bohemians: The Lovers Who Led Germany's Resistance Against the Nazis. Boston: Houghton Mifflin Harcourt. ISBN 978-1-328-56623-2.
- Ohler, Norman (2020). The infiltrators: the lovers who led Germany's resistance against the Nazis. London: Atlantic Books. ISBN 9781838952129.
- Perrault, Gilles (1969). The Red Orchestra. New York: Schocken Books. ISBN 0-8052-0952-2.
- Petrescu (2010). Against All Odds: Models of Subversive Spaces in National Socialist Germany. Peter Lang. ISBN 978-3-03911-845-8.
- Scheel, Heinrich (1994). "Die Rote Kapelle – Widerstand, Verfolgung, Haft". In Coppi, Hans Jr; Danyel, Jürgen; Tuchel, Johannes (eds.). Die Rote Kapelle im Widerstand gegen Hitler. Berlin: Rütten & Loenig. ISBN 3-89468-110-1.
- Siegmund, Sören; Ku Huu, Quan; Enderlein, Thomas (January 2000). "Mildred Harnack". Mildred-Harnack School. Mildred-Harnack Schule. Archived from the original on 3 April 2026.
- Steinbach, Peter; Tuchel (2004). Widerstand gegen die nationalsozialistische Diktatur 1933-1945 (in German). Lukas. ISBN 978-3-936872-37-8.
- Tuchel, Johannes (1988). "Weltanschauliche Motivationen in Der Harnack/Schulze-Boysen-Organisation: (Rote Kapelle)". Kirchliche Zeitgeschichte (in German). 1 (2): 267–292. JSTOR 43750615.
- Tyas, Stephen (25 June 2017). SS-Major Horst Kopkow: From the Gestapo to British Intelligence. Fonthill Media. GGKEY:JT39J4WQW30.
- West, Nigel (12 November 2007). Historical Dictionary of World War II Intelligence. Scarecrow Press. ISBN 978-0-8108-6421-4.
- "Mildred Harnack geb. Fish". Stolpersteine in Berlin. Koordinierungsstelle Stolpersteine Berlin. 20 September 2013.
