= Karl Behrens =

Design engineer and resistance fighter against Nazism (1909–1943)

- Karl Behrens in 1943
- Born: 18 November 1909; Berlin, German Empire
- Died: 13 May 1943 (aged 33); Plötzensee Prison, Berlin Nazi Germany
- Cause of death: Execution by guillotine
- Occupation: Tool maker
- Known for: Member of the Red Orchestra

Karl Behrens (18 November 1909 – 13 May 1943) He was a design engineer and resistance fighter against Nazism. Behrens was most notable for being a member of the Berlin-based anti-fascist resistance group, that was later called the Red Orchestra by the Abwehr. Behrens acted as a courier for the group, passing reports between Arvid Harnack and Hans Coppi who was the radioman. Behrens was also active in a resistance group at the AEG turbine factory power together with Walter Homann and others.

== Life ==
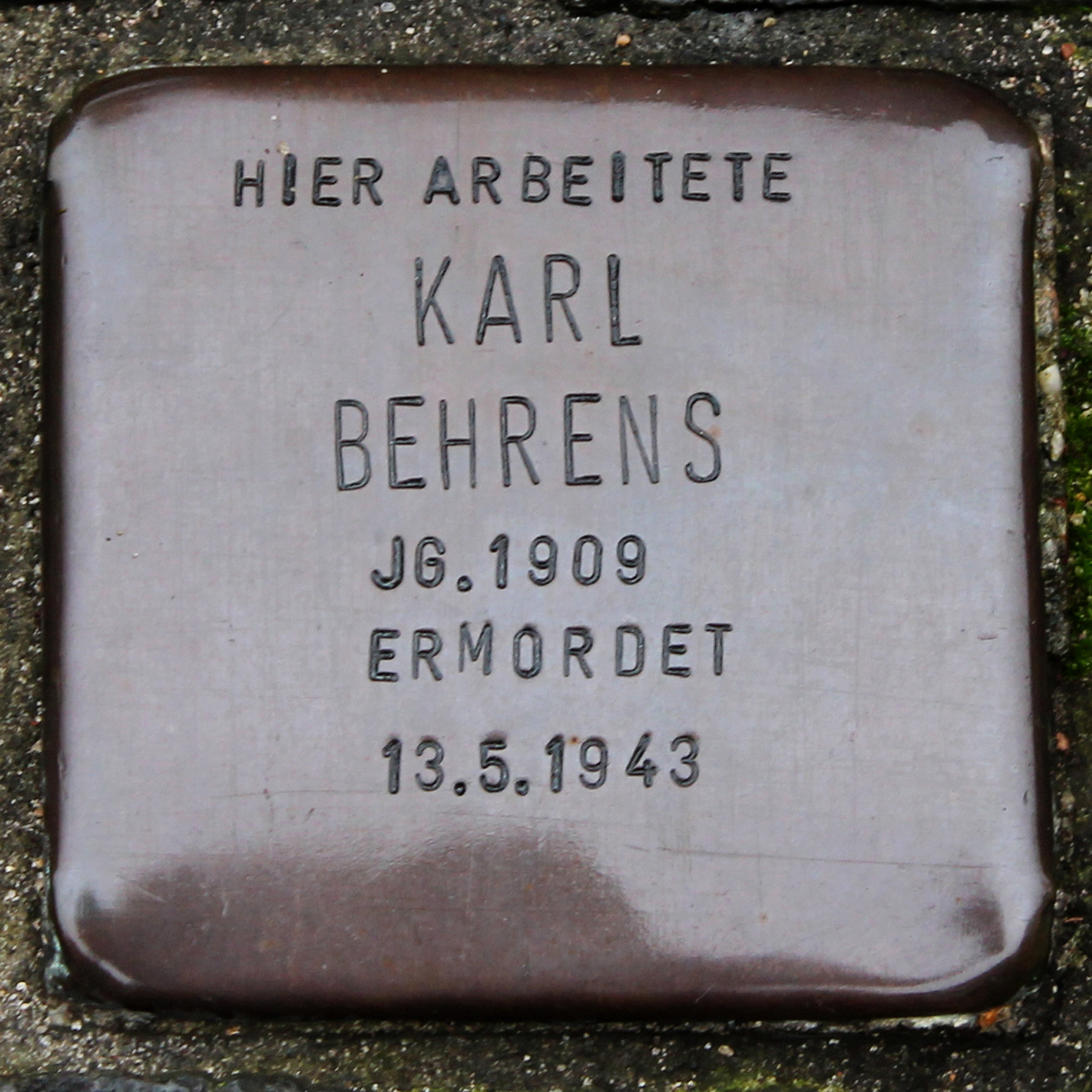
Stolperstein (stumbling block) of Karl Behrens located at 12 Huttenstraße (Siemens AG Gas Turbine Plant Berlin premises), Moabit, Berlin

Behrens was the second child of Minna and Carl Behrens. His siblings were Lisa (born in 1908) and Walter (born in 1915). Behrens came from a working-class family.

Behrens started his education in 1917 at a primary school in Berlin and finished on 4 April 1924 at a protestant primary school in Wesel. As a young man in 1927, he became a scout in the Rabenstein Scout group. He remained a scout until 1931.

In 1937 Behrens met his future wife Clara Behrens, nee Sonnenschmidt, through his friend Otto Franck from the scout movement. He married Clara Sonnenschmidt on 25 February 1939. Behrens had three children. These were two sons and a daughter; Peter (born 1939), Martha (born 1941) and Karl-Helmut (born 1942).

== Career ==
On 15 May 1924 Behrens started a locksmith apprenticeship and after completing it, became unemployed. Coming from the Boy Scouts, he joined the Sturmabteilung in 1929 and joined the Nazi Party. In April 1931, he was expelled from the party for supporting Walther Stennes in his attempted coup against Hitler, in what became known as the Stennes Revolt. In 1931, he temporarily joined Otto Strasser's Black Front before moving to join the Communist Party of Germany(KPD) at the end of 1932. From 1932 to 1936, he attended the Berlin Abendgymnasium (Evening Grammar School) where he achieved the Abitur from the Berlin Abendgymnasium and then went on to study mechanical engineering at the Beuth School in Wedding, now known as the Beuth University of Applied Sciences Berlin. At the Berlin Abendgymnasium, he met the American Mildred Harnack, who taught English. and the interpreter Bodo Schlösinger, whose wife was Rose Schlösinger. Behrens joined the oppositional discussion circle around her husband Arvid Harnack. In 1935, he was arrested for selling the communist newspaper, Gegenangriff (Counterattack) but was released as there was no firm evidence. In 1935, he resigned from the KPD. In 1938, Behrens began working as a design engineer at the giant AEG turbine factory in Brunnenstrasse in Berlin.

== Resistance ==
Behrens became one of Arvid Harnack's closest comrades-in-arms in the resistance. Through his work at the AEG factory as a designer and his contacts with former KPD officials, he was able to provide political, economic and military information to the Soviet People's Commissariat for State Security (NKGB), where he was assigned the code name, Lutschisti (Shining One, Ray of Light or Beamer). In February 1939, Behrens married Clara Behrens, née Sonnenschmidt, a stenotypist in the OKH and they had two sons and a daughter together. Owing to Behren's having children, Arvid Harnack decided in 1941 not to use him as a radio operator for a planned connection with the Soviet Union. He is said to have forwarded encrypted messages from Arvid Harnack to Hans Coppi a few times. In the same year, Behrens was arrested for forging exit papers for his Jewish brother-in-law, Charly Fischer. Fischer was eventually captured and was executed at Sachsenhausen concentration camp.

== Arrest ==
In April 1942, Behrens was conscripted and in May 1942 was assigned into an artillery unit, as a radio operator. In Haguenau he completed basic training. On 22 July 1942, he was moved to Kraków, then by train on the 24 July, was moved to Lemberg in Ukraine. In a barracks near Simferopol, he underwent further training in preparation for operations at the front. Behrens was then moved to Tosno on the Eastern Front where he began his first military operation.

He was arrested on 16 September 1942 at midday, on the Eastern Front outside Saint Petersburg, then Leningrad. On 20 January 1943, he was sentenced to death by the 2nd senate of the Reichskriegsgericht and executed in Plötzensee Prison. His wife Clare Behrens survived the war and became a tailor.

== Literature ==
- Regina Griebel; Marlies Coburger; Heinrich Scheel (1992). Erfasst?: das Gestapo-Album zur Roten Kapelle: eine Foto-Dokumentation (in German). Halle/S.: Audioscop. ISBN 978-3-88384-044-4. OCLC 29316949.
- Oleschinski, Brigitte (2002). Gedenkstätte Plötzensee (in German). Berlin: Gedenkstätte Deutscher Widerstand. ISBN 978-3-926082-05-3. OCLC 254638886.
- Rosiejka, Gert (1986). Die Rote Kapelle "Landesverrat" als antifaschist. Widerstand. Ergebnisse, 33 (in German). Hamburg: Ergebnisse-Verlag. ISBN 978-3-925622-16-8. OCLC 74741321.
- Kraushaar, Luise (1970). Deutsche Widerstandskämpfer 1933–1945. Biographien und Briefe. Vol. 1. Berlin: Dietz. pp. 98–101.
- Juchler, Ingo (2017). Mildred Harnack und die Rote Kapelle in Berlin (in German). Potsdam: Universitäts verlag. ISBN 978-3-86956-407-4. OCLC 1009082138.

== Awards and honors ==
- On 6 October 1969, he was posthumously awarded the Order of the Patriotic War First Class by the Soviet Union.
- On 18 November 2009, a commemorative plaque was dedicated by the Friedrichshain-Kreuzberg district office at Karl Behrens' former home at 22 Yorckstraße (corner house to 91 Möckernstraße).
- Karl Behrens is honoured with a stumbling stone at 12 Huttenstraße in Moabit, Berlin.
