= Adam Kuckhoff =

German writer, journalist, and resistance fighter (1887–1943)

- Adam Kuckhoff
- Born: 30 August 1887; Aachen, German Empire
- Died: 5 August 1943 (aged 55); Plötzensee Prison, Berlin, Germany
- Occupations: Writer, journalist
- Spouse: Greta
- Writing career
- Notable work: Scherry

Adam Kuckhoff (German: [ˈaːdam ˈkʊkˌhɔf], 30 August 1887 – 5 August 1943) was a German writer, journalist, and German resistance member of the anti-fascist resistance group that was later called the Red Orchestra by the Gestapo.

== Life ==
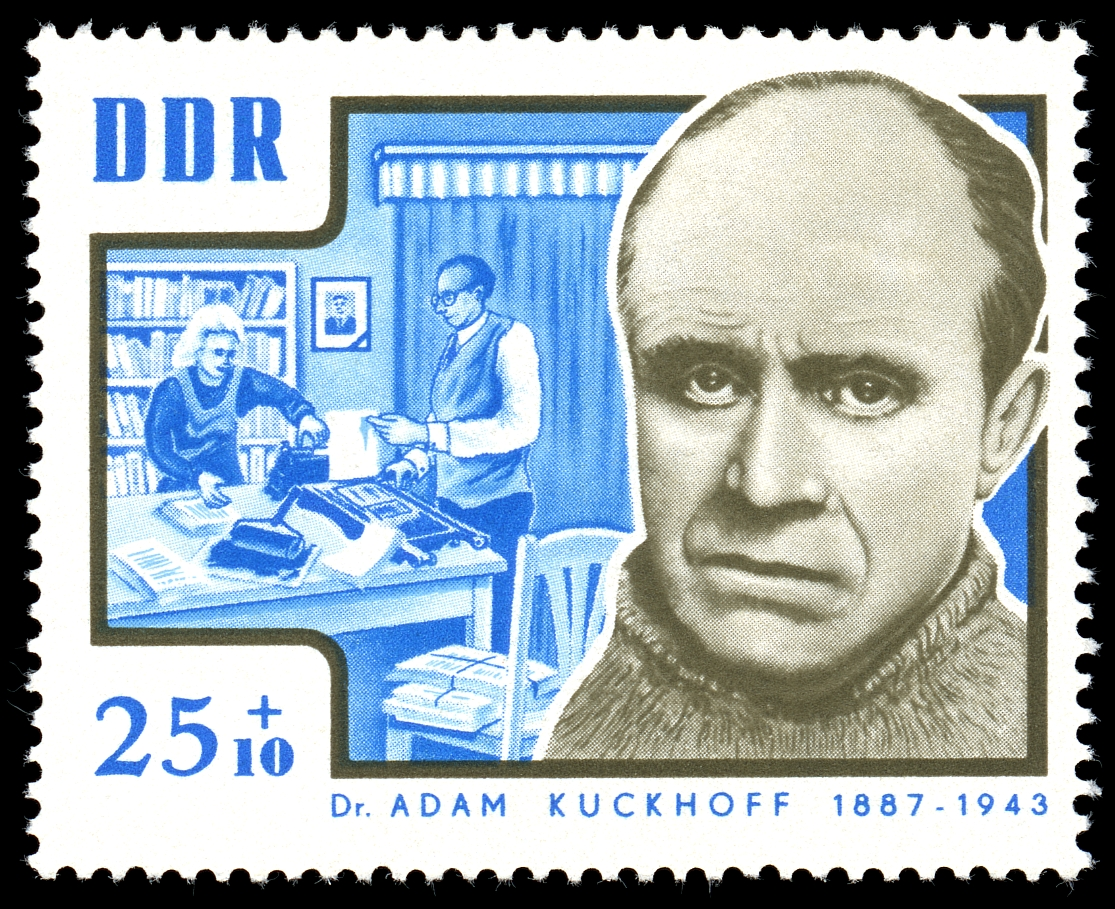
East German commemorative stamp of Kuckhoff

Adam Kuckhoff published a popular edition of the works of Georg Büchner in 1927, and headed the cultural-political magazine Die Tat ("The Deed") in 1928–1929, which he gave a left-wing, socialist flavour. In 1931, he wrote the artistic novel Scherry about Grock. Between 1931 and 1932, he was a dramatic adviser at the Berlin Schauspielhaus. His main work, the world war novel Der Deutsche von Bayencourt ("The German from Bayencourt") appeared in Germany in 1937.

He and his wife Greta were involved with Arvid and Mildred Harnack and the Red Orchestra. He was arrested in Prague on 12 September 1942, following the arrests of Harnack and many other members of the organization. He was executed at Plötzensee Prison on 5 August 1943.

In East Germany, Kuckhoff was honoured as a resistance member. In Leipzig-Grünau a school was named after him. It bore his name from 1985 to 1990. In his home town Aachen a street was named after him. There is also a street in Halle (Saale) named after him.
