= Greta Kuckhoff =

German Resistance member (1902–1981)

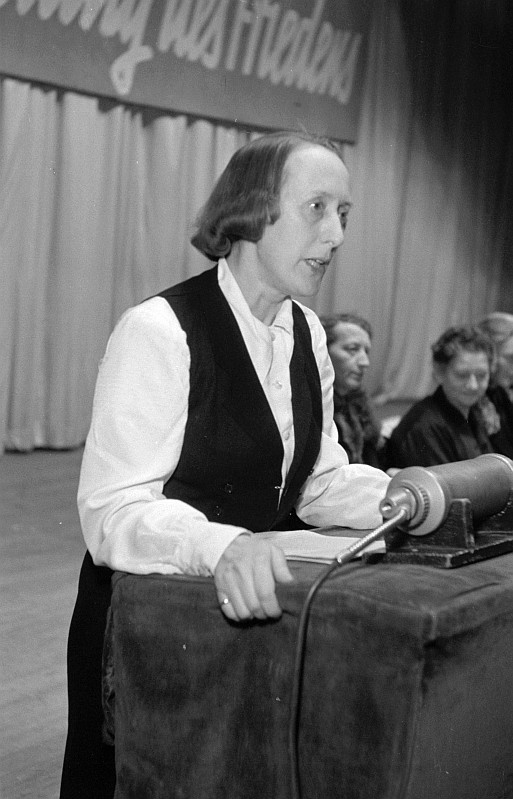
- Greta Kuckhoff (1947)
- Born: Margaretha Lorke; 14 December 1902; Frankfurt (Oder), Province of Brandenburg, German Empire
- Died: 11 November 1981 (aged 78); Frankfurt (Oder), Bezirk Frankfurt, East Germany
- Occupations: Politician; Bank President
- Political party: KPD; SED
- Spouse: Adam Kuckhoff
- Children: Ule Kuckhoff

Margaretha "Greta" Kuckhoff (née Lorke; 14 December 1902 – 11 November 1981) was a Resistance member in Nazi Germany, who belonged to the Communist Party of Germany and the NKVD spy ring that was dubbed the Red Orchestra by the Abwehr. She was married to Adam Kuckhoff, who was executed by the Third Reich. After the war, she lived in the German Democratic Republic, where she was president of Deutsche Notenbank from 1950 to 1958.

== Life ==
Kuckhoff was born Margaretha Lorke in Frankfurt on the Oder into a poor Catholic family. Her father was a carpenter and built musical instruments, whilst her mother was a seamstress. She later wrote warmly about her childhood; she attended Kleist School, wrote poems for the archbishop and attended the Lyzeum and Oberlyzeum in her hometown.

== Education ==
After training to be a teacher, in 1924, Kuckhoff began to study sociology and economics at Humboldt University in Berlin and at the University of Würzburg. From 1927 to 1929, she studied abroad in the United States at the University of Wisconsin, Madison, where, at the "Friday Niters Club", Friday evening gatherings organized by John R. Commons, she met Mildred and Arvid Harnack. While in Madison, she became an honorary fellow of the sociology department. She graduated in 1929.

Between 1930 and 1932, she lived in Zurich, Switzerland, working for R. Rosendorf, a lawyer, and as a language teacher and freelance translator in the area of business law. Returning to Germany, she became Karl Mannheim's secretary at the Institut für Sozialforschung in Frankfurt am Main. In 1933, she studied briefly at the London School of Economics and made arrangements in preparation for Mannheim's escape from Germany.

In 1933, she met the writer Adam Kuckhoff. They were married on 28 August 1937. Their son, Ule, was born on 8 January 1938.

== Resistance ==
Her first involvement in opposition activities was during this period, when she and her husband decided to work against the Third Reich. They got back in touch with the Harnacks and became involved with Harro and Libertas Schulze-Boysen and the Red Orchestra. In acts of civil disobedience working to convince others to oppose the Nazis, Kuckhoff held lectures and wrote articles analyzing politics and the economy. Within her sphere, she had contact with other Resistance groups, including the Herbert Baum group, who were Jewish; the Bonheffer brothers, Dietrich and Klaus; and the White Rose, whom she knew through Arvid Harnack's brother Falk. Also through Harnack, she met Hans von Dohnanyi from the Kreisau Circle. She was also friendly with others in her own group, such as Adolf Grimme.

In 1935, she joined the Communist Party of Germany (Kommunistische Partei Deutschlands, or KPD). In fact she joined the KPD/SED after World War II and her move to east Berlin to facilitate a life in the nascent GDR. Party politics and the re-writing of history to fit the lore dictated by Moscow made officials pre-date her party membership to 1935.

Through a professional contact, she began working freelance for the Reich Ministry of Public Enlightenment and Propaganda, translating Nazi Party congress speeches and articles about Nazi racial policy. In 1939, she worked for James Vincent Murphy on the English translation of Hitler's Mein Kampf, hoping the translation would educate the British public about Hitler.

The Red Orchestra's activities were discovered in 1942 and arrests began on 30 July. In the following weeks, the organization was crushed as dozens of people were arrested. (Note: Kuckhoff was one of 19 women from the Red Orchestra who were held at the police prison on Kantstraße in Charlottenburg-Wilmersdorf and in Berlin alone, there were 117 people arrested.) Kuckhoff was arrested by the Gestapo at her apartment on 12 September 1942; her husband in Prague on the same day. On 3 February 1943, she was sentenced to death as an "accomplice to high treason and [for] failure to report a case of espionage". Her sentence was lifted on 4 May. A few months later, however, in a second trial on 27 September 1943, her civil rights were revoked for "abetting the progress of an organization of high treason and encouraging the enemy". She was sentenced to 10 years in a labor prison and served her sentence first at the women's Zuchthaus in Cottbus; on 4 February 1945 she was sent to Waldheim Zuchthaus, where she was liberated by the Red Army on 8 May 1945. Her husband was executed at Plötzensee Prison; she learned of his death from the prison chaplain.

== After World War II ==
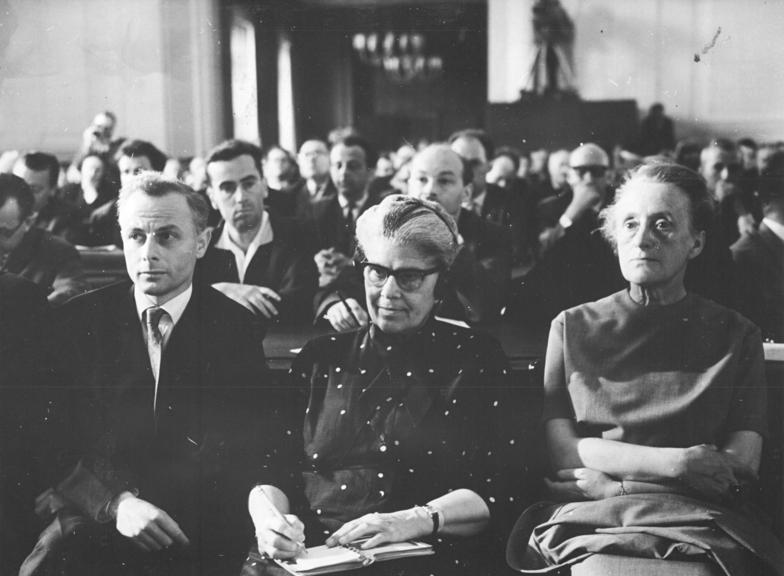
Greta Kuckhoff (right) at the Globke trial, 1963. To her left is Eslanda Goode Robeson, wife of Paul Robeson

In 1945, Greta Kuckhoff re-joined the KPD (Note: Her admission date to the KPD was made retroactive to 1935, when she first joined.) and in May 1945, was appointed the leader of the postwar reconstruction Bureau of Denazified and Abandoned Factories (Amtsstelle für die entnazifizierten und herrenlosen Betriebe) in Berlin. In April 1946, she became a member of the Socialist Unity Party (Sozialistische Einheitspartei Deutschlands, or SED) when the KPD leadership forced a merger with the East German Social Democrats.

She, alongside Adolf Grimme and Günther Weisenborn, attempted to gain legal redress against the former Nazi judge who had convicted them all, Manfred Roeder. After years of delays by the Lüneburg state's attorney, the case was dropped at the end of the 1960s.

Beginning in 1946, Kuckhoff worked in business and government within the German Democratic Republic (GDR), working within the SED and organizations. From 1949 to 1958, she was a representative in the provincial Volkskammer; from 1950 to 1958, she was the president of the central bank that preceded the GDR's Staatsbank. In 1958, she had a disagreement within the SED and was forced out of the bank, though officially, she stepped down for her health. Following her removal from the bank, she became active in the Peace Council of the GDR. In 1964, she became vice president of the Council and a member of the World Peace Council. In 1972, she published her memoirs under the title, Vom Rosenkranz zur Roten Kapelle.

Kuckhoff died in Wandlitz, aged 78. She was cremated and honoured with burial in the Pergolenweg Ehrengrab section of Berlin's Friedrichsfelde Cemetery.

== Legacy ==
There are streets in Berlin, Leipzig, Aachen and Lützen named Kuckhoffstraße, after Greta and Adam Kuckhoff. The installation of a stolperstein for Greta Kuckhoff in Frankfurt on the Oder is planned for 5 May 2012.

== Publications ==
- Kuckhoff, Greta (1 January 1974). Vom Rosenkranz zur Roten Kapelle. Ein Lebensbericht [From the Rosary to the Red Orchestra: A Memoir] (in German). Verlag Neues Leben.

== Awards and honors ==
- 1955 Clara Zetkin Prize
- 1955 Patriotic Order of Merit in silver
- 1958 Medal for Fighters against Fascism
- 1965 Patriotic Order of Merit in gold
- 1967 Honorary citizen, City of Frankfurt (Oder)
- 1968 Carl von Ossietzky Prize of the Peace Council of the GDR
- 1972 Star of People's Friendship in gold
- 1973 Honorary doctorate from Martin Luther University of Halle-Wittenberg
- 1977 Thomasius Plaque from Martin Luther University of Halle-Wittenberg
- 1980 Karl Marx Order

== Sources ==
- Griebel, Regina; Coburger, Marlies; Scheel, Heinrich; Gedenkstätte der Deutscher Widerstand; Senatsverwaltung für Kulturelle Angelegenheiten; Geheime Staatspolizei (1992). Erfasst? : das Gestapo-Album zur Roten Kapelle : eine Foto-Dokumentation (in German). Halle: Audioscop. ISBN 9783883840444.
- Rosiejka, Gert (1986). Die Rote Kapelle : "Landesverrat" als antifaschist. Widerstand. Ergebnisse, 33. (in German) (1st ed.). Hamburg: Ergebnisse-Verl. ISBN 3-925622-16-0. OCLC 74741321.
- Brysac, Shareen Blair (2003). Mildred Harnack und die Rote Kapelle : die Geschichte einer ungewöhnlichen Frau und einer Widerstandsbewegung (1st ed.). Bern: Scherz. ISBN 3-502-18090-3.
- Nelson, Anne (2010). Die Rote Kapelle die Geschichte der legendären Widerstandsgruppe (in German) (1. Aufl ed.). Munich: Bertelsmann. ISBN 978-3-570-10021-9.
- Puttbus, Joachim (24 January 1952). "Greta Kuckhoff" (in German). No. 4. Zeit-Verlag Gerd Bucerius GmbH & Co. KG. Die Zeit Online.
