= Otto Hoetzsch =

Otto Hoetzsch (14 February 1876 – 27 August 1946), was a German academic and politician (German Conservative Party, DNVP and KVP). At the beginning of the 20th century, he was one of the founders of East German research and advocated dealing with the Eastern European states amicably. For this reason, when he spoke out against annexationist efforts towards Russia in 1917, the National Socialists defamed him as a pro-Bolshevik.

== Biography ==
Son of a plumber, he studied history, economics and history of art in Leipzig, starting in 1895. In 1899 he obtained a PhD, worked for several newspapers and was active in the Alldeutscher Verband and favoured the creation of a German Navy. In 1905 he passed the exam as an interpreter in Polish, Russian, Ukrainian, French, English, Italian and Dutch. Between 1906 and 1913 he taught in the Prussian Royal Academy in Posen. In 1913 he became Professor for Eastern European history in Berlin.

He started his political career as a member of the Prussian constitutional assembly. In 1918 he joined the DNVP (German National People's Party), and was a member of the Reichstag from 1920 to 1930. In 1922 he helped negotiate the Treaty of Rapallo with the new Soviet Union, as an interpreter. He felt that this would also lead to an international rehabilitation of Germany after the Great War.

He greatly admired President Hindenburg, whom he also entertained at dinner in his home.

Between 1923 and 1934 he repeatedly travelled to the Soviet Union and founded the Journal Osteuropa (Eastern Europe) which still exists. In 1928 he went on an extensive lecturing tour through the United States. Back in Berlin he maintained contacts with Russian emigrants.

Although he was a German nationalist (like many of his contemporaries in 1914 he had enthusiastically welcomed the outbreak of World War I), the Nazis considered him a Bolshevik. Consequently, he resigned from the Reichstag in 1932 and was forced to retire in 1935.

After World War II, he once more became a professor of history in Berlin, this time with Soviet approval. He published extensively on Russian and American History and was widely recognized in both East and West Germany.

In 1966 his classic text Grundzüge der Geschichte Russlands was translated and published as The Evolution of Russia as part of the "Library of European Civilization" series.
