= KLK Calling PTZ – The Red Orchestra =

KLK an PTX – Die Rote Kapelle
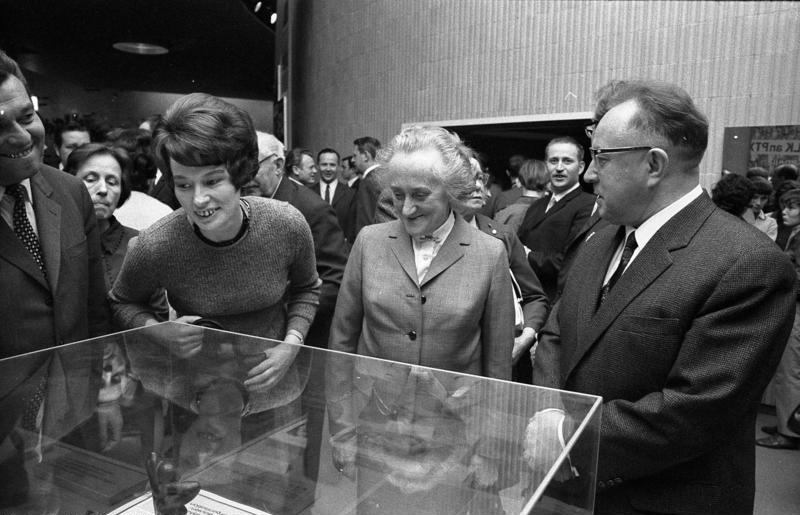
- Greta Kuckhoff, former member of the Red Orchestra, and actress Barbara Adolph who played her in the film, during the premiere of KLK an PTX. 25 March 1971.
- Directed by: Horst E. Brandt
- Written by: Wera and Claus Küchenmeister
- Produced by: Heinz Herrmann, Wolfgang Rennebarth
- Starring: Horst Drinda, Irma Münch, Horst Schulze
- Cinematography: Günter Haubold
- Edited by: Erika Lehmphul
- Music by: Helmut Nier
- Production company: DEFA
- Distributed by: PROGRESS-Film Verleih
- Release date: 25 March 1971
- Running time: 101 minutes
- Country: East Germany
- Language: German
- Budget: 6,600,000 East German Mark

KLK Calling PTZ – The Red Orchestra (alternate title: KLK To PTX – The Red Band; German: KLK an PTX – Die Rote Kapelle) is a 1971 East German film about the history of the Red Orchestra espionage ring.

== Plot ==
After Hitler's rise to power in 1933, a group of regime opponents from various backgrounds consolidated under the leadership of Harro Schulze-Boysen and Arvid Harnack. They gather intelligence and pass it on to other countries. After the outbreak of the Second World War, and especially after the German invasion of the Soviet Union, they intensify their work. In August 1942, the Gestapo arrests Boysen and soon after cracks down on the spy ring.

== Cast ==
- Horst Drinda: Arvid Harnack
- Irma Münch: Mildred Harnack
- Horst Schulze: Adam Kuckhoff
- Barbara Adolph: Greta Kuckhoff
- Klaus Piontek: Harro Schulze-Boysen
- Jutta Wachowiak: Libertas Schulze-Boysen
- Harry Pietzsch: Walter Küchenmeister
- Karin Lesch: Elfriede Paul
- Marylu Poolman: Elisabeth Schumacher
- Eberhard Esche: Kurt Schumacher
- Katharina Lind: Oda Schottmüller
- Günther Simon: John Sieg
- Jessy Rameik: Sophie Sieg
- Ursula Karusseit: Hilde Coppi
- Manfred Karge: Hans Coppi
- Leon Niemczyk: Vincente Douglas
- Siegfried Weiss: Wilhelm Canaris
- Alfred Müller: Wolfgang Langhoff
- Hannjo Hasse: guest in the American Embassy
- Alfred Struwe: Bellini
- Peter Sturm: Krapotschkin
- Horst Giese: Schröder

== Production ==
Writer Claus Küchenmeister and his wife Wera began conducting interviews with former members of the Red Orchestra during 1966. Claus, son of the executed organization member Walter Küchenmeister, intended to make a documentary about the activities of his father. When officials in the Ministry of State Security's Department of Agitation heard of his project, he was granted full government support and access to previously undisclosed materials in the Ministry's archives. Rather than documentary, a full-length feature film was commissioned.

== Reception ==
KLK Calling PTZ was distributed in fifty-eight copies, and sold 2,107,093 tickets in the first year after its release.

On 4 October 1971, director Horst E. Brandt, cinematographer Günter Haubold and the Küchenmeister couple were awarded the National Prize 1st class for their work on the film. Alongside dramatist Anne Pfeuffer and actors Horst Drinda, Irma Münch, Horst Schulze, Klaus Piontek, Barbara Adolph, Jutta Wachowiak, Manfred Karge, Ursula Karusseit, Harry Pietzsch, Eberhard Esche and Günther Simon they were granted the Art Prize of the Free German Trade Union Federation in the same year.

Daniela Bergahn noted that, while the film still "inflated" the role of the communists in the resistance to the Nazis, it "at least acknowledged" the participation of other groups. In 1972, the West German story version was disseminated in the television mini series "Die rote Kapelle".
