= Gisela von Pöllnitz =

German journalist (1911–1939)

Gisela von Pöllnitz (12 January 1911 – 14 September 1939) was a German journalist, communist, and resistance fighter against the Nazi regime. During the Nazi regime, she was a notable member of the Berlin-based anti-fascist resistance group around Harro Schulze-Boysen, later called the Red Orchestra by the Abwehr. Throughout her life von Pöllnitz had a lung condition that progressively worsened after being arrested several times by the Gestapo. On her final arrest by the Gestapo she contracted tuberculosis after 5 months in custody. Her physician Elfriede Paul arranged a sanitarium in Switzerland, but she never recovered.

== Life ==
Von Pöllnitz was a diplomat's daughter and a member of the Young Communist League of Germany (KJVD) in Hamburg prior to 1933. Because of her aristocratic background and extensive travel experience, she was not taken seriously by her peers in the communist group. In November 1933 she was arrested by the Gestapo, interrogated for being a communist and badly beaten. When she hit back, she was imprisoned for two months in the Fuhlsbüttel prison. In 1934, von Pöllnitz was again under scrutiny and was searched by a Gestapo official. A banned Rote Hilfe organisation booklet was found stuffed down her underpants but she managed to grab it, tear it up and swallow the small pieces of paper. But she spent another two months in prison and was denied a driving license as additional punishment. The Gestapo soon concluded she was not a fervent or dogmatic leftist, her activities for the KJVD and later for the Communist Party of Germany being merely a reflection of her thirst for adventure.

In the mid-1930s, with the assistance of her distant cousin Libertas Schulze-Boysen, she found a job as a short-hand typist at the news agency United Press. Later, she became a journalist under the direction of Gösta von Uexküll.

== Schulze-Boysen group ==
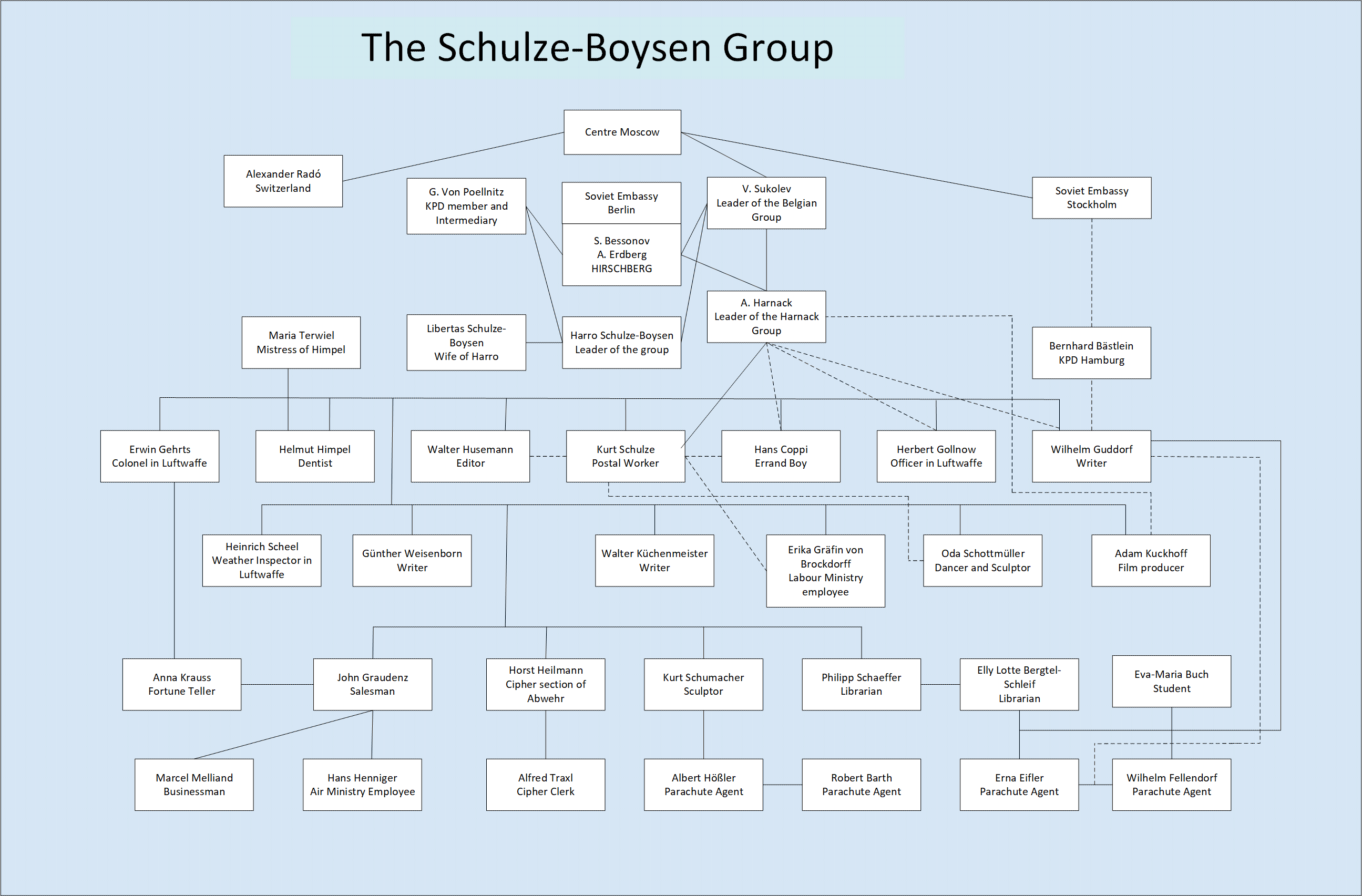
The Schulze-Boysen group in Germany

In 1937, von Pöllnitz, by now an activist and anti-fascist, became friends with writer and pacifist Günther Weisenborn. Both joined the private meetings usually held in Schulze-Boysen's apartment and occasionally in the apartment of the sculptor Kurt Schumacher. Von Pöllnitz, a rebel and adventurer, and Weisenborn, an anti-fascist, were not content to just meet in small groups or stay silent about Hitler's tyranny. During the same period, Schulze-Boysen's belief in the national German revolutionary fervour changed to a belief in communist ideology.

In the same year, von Pöllnitz received information from Schulze-Boysen about the Spanish Civil War. This spurred her to prepare leaflets about the war, which she then passed to Elfriede Paul, who hand-posted them to letterboxes throughout Berlin.

Also in 1937, Schulze-Boysen had compiled a short information document about a sabotage enterprise planned in Barcelona by the German Wehrmacht. It was an action from "Special Staff W", an organisation established by Luftwaffe general Helmuth Wilberg to study and analyse the tactical lessons learned by the Legion Kondor during the Spanish Civil War. The "Special Staff W" unit also directed the German support operations that consisted of volunteers, weapons and ammunition for General Francisco Franco's FET y de las JONS Party. The information that Schulze-Boysen collected included details about German transports, deployment of units and companies involved in the German defense. The group around Schulze-Boysen did not know how to deliver the information to the Soviets. Given that von Pöllnitz was planning to visit the Exposition Internationale des Arts et Techniques dans la Vie Moderne that was being held in Paris between 25 May to 25 November 1937, the group decided that she should deliver the letter to the Soviet Embassy in Paris. In due course, von Pöllnitz fulfilled her mission and placed the letter in the mailbox of the Soviet Embassy on the Bois de Boulogne. Unfortunately, the building was being watched by the Gestapo, and after posting the letter, von Pöllnitz was arrested by the Gestapo in November 1937.

In this context, the historian Heinrich Scheel recalled the words of a Gestapo commissioner: "During the Spanish Civil War, we sent people of ours to the International Brigade as spies. Schulze-Boysen knew their names and transmitted them to the Reds. Our people were then put on the wall."

The resistance group, fearing discovery and arrest, temporarily disbanded. The apartment of the Schulze-Boysen's was searched and although the Gestapo had demanded the dismissal of Harro Schulze-Boysen, he only received an official reprimand at the Ministry of Aviation.

On 5 July 1938, von Pöllnitz was released from Gestapo imprisonment after five months. Once she was released, the group found that she was emaciated. Despite torture, she had kept silent and not revealed the reason for her trip to Paris. Given that she had weak lungs, she was infected with tuberculosis in prison. On 15 June 1939, von Pöllnitz, now seriously ill with pulmonary tuberculosis, was taken to a sanatorium in Switzerland on the advice of her doctor Elfriede Paul. She died there a few weeks later.

== Literature ==
- Paul, Elfriede; Küchenmeister, Wera (1987). Ein Sprechzimmer der Roten Kapelle (3rd ed.). Berlin: Militärverlag der Deutschen Demokratischen Republik. ISBN 9783327004210.
- Coppi, Hans (1995). Harro Schulze-Boysen - Wege in den Widerstand eine biographische Studie, Technische Universität Berlin (Thesis). Koblenz Fölbach. ISBN 9783923532285. OCLC 1068161156.
- Scheel, Heinrich (1993). Vor den Schranken des Reichskriegsgerichts : mein Weg in den Widerstand [In front of the barriers of the Reichskriegsgericht: My way into the resistance] (in German). Berlin: Ed. q. ISBN 9783861241478. OCLC 246617412.
- Kettelhake, Silke (2008). Erzähl allen, allen von mir Das schöne kurze Leben der Libertas Schulze-Boysen 1913-1942 [Tell everyone, all of me;The beautiful short life of the Libertas Schulze-Boysen 1913-1942]. Munich: Droemer. ISBN 978-3426274378. OCLC 770669492.
- Rosiejka, Gert (1986). Die Rote Kapelle : "Landesverrat" als antifaschist. Widerstand [The Red Orchestra: "Treason" as an anti-fascist. Resistance]. Ergebnisse (in German). Vol. 33. Hamburg: Ergebnisse. ISBN 9783925622168. OCLC 74741321.

== See also ==
- Walter Küchenmeister
