= Walter Küchenmeister =

German writer and anti-fascist activist (1897–1943)

- Born: 9 January 1897; Waldheim, Saxony
- Died: 13 May 1943 (aged 46); Berlin, Nazi Germany
- Occupations: turner, journalist, editor
- Writing career
- Notable works: Biography of Thomas Müntzer and Tilman Riemenschneider

Walter Küchenmeister (9 January 1897 – 13 May 1943) was a German machine technician, journalist, editor, writer and resistance fighter against the Nazi regime. Küchenmeister was a member of the anti-fascist resistance group, that was later called the Red Orchestra by the Abwehr. Küchenmeister was notable for being part of the close group that constituted the Schulze-Boysen group of individuals.

== Life ==
Küchenmeister was the son of a shoemaker. After leaving elementary school, as a young man he worked ironworker and a miner, eventually gaining an apprenticeship as a turner. In 1911, Küchenmeister became involved in the youth committee of the Metal Workers Union.

Küchenmeister married Anna Auguste Küchenmeister née Lasnowski in Ahlen in 1926. They had two sons from the marriage, Rainer Küchenmeister who was born in 1926 and who would later be an artist and university professor and Claus Küchenmeister who was born in 1930 and was a writer. Küchenmeister mother had died in an air raid.

== Career ==
In 1917 he volunteered to become a sailor the Imperial German Navy during World War I and on 3 November 1918 was part of the Kiel mutiny. At the end of the first world war he joined the Social Democratic Party of Germany. In 1920, he became a communist and joined the Communist Party of Germany (KPD). In 1921 he was promoted to a KPD party functionary, an Ortsgruppenleiter for the town of Ahlen.During the same year, Küchenmeister started work as an editor on the Westphalian Arbeiterzeitung (Workers Party), that was considered one of the most radical social-democratic newspapers in Germany. He also edited the communist newspaper, the Ruhr Echo in Essen, a position he held until 1926. In 1926 he was expelled from the KPD for non-proletarian behaviour and was suspected of being a police informer and embezzler and this stigmatized his position as an orthodox communist, making him seen by his peer group as a traitor and ex-comrade. To earn a living he became an advertiser and freelance writer. In the six years that followed he wrote a biography of the German preacher and radical theologian Thomas Müntzer and the German sculptor and woodcarver Tilman Riemenschneider.

In 1929, Küchenmeister and his wife Annie moved to Berlin with their son Rainer and where their second son Claus Küchenmeister was born. In Berlin he collaborated with the political journalist Karl Otto Paetel and National Bolshevism group. Between 1933 and 1934 Küchenmeister was twice jailed, including a 9-month jail sentence spent in Sonnenburg concentration camp where he was infected by a stomach ulcer and tuberculosis being released early as an invalid. After his release he continued to work as a political writer. In 1935 Küchenmeister worked on the underground resistance newspaper Wille zum Reich along with Werner Dissel.

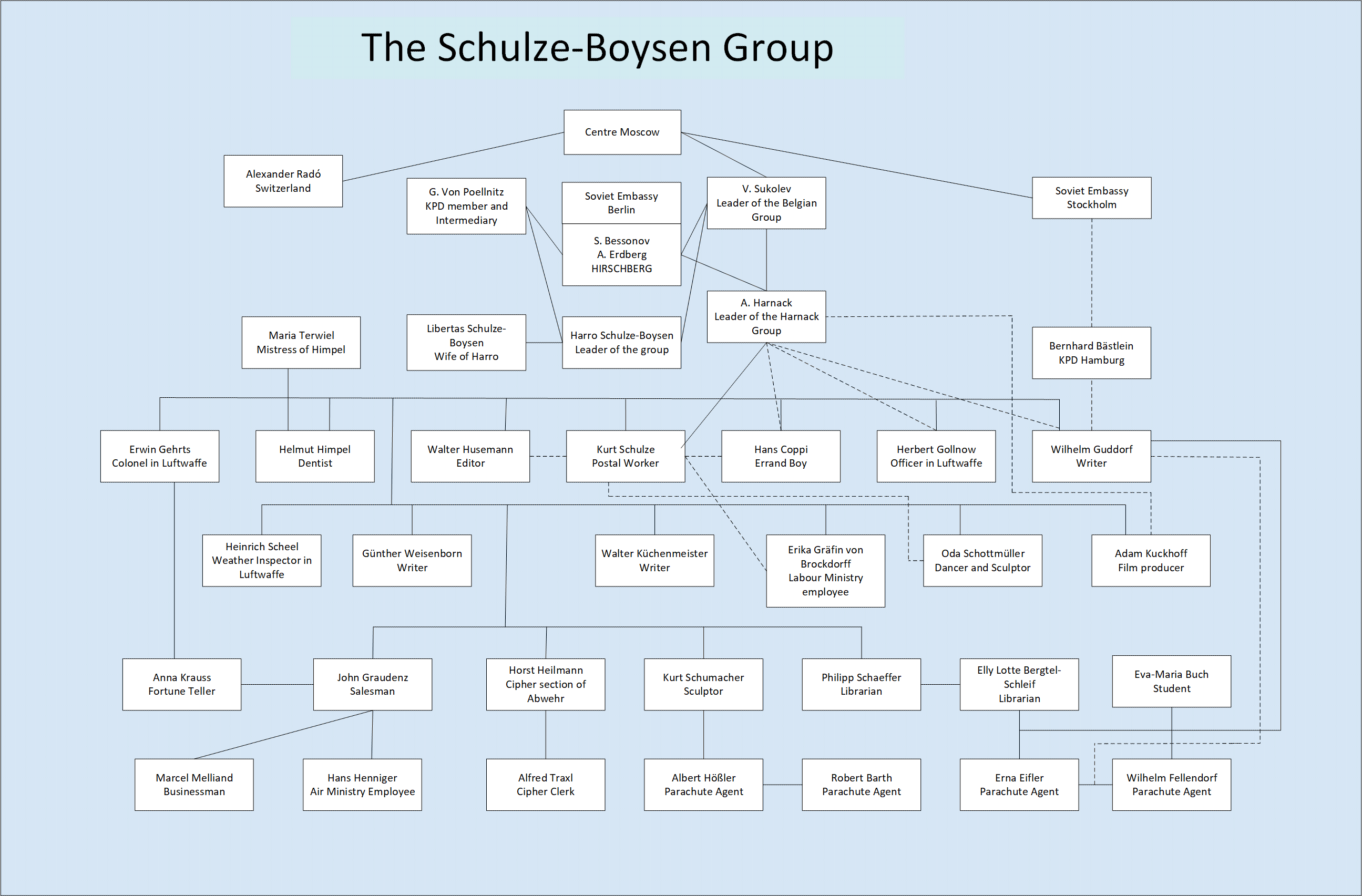
The Schulze-Boysen group in Germany

In 1935, Küchenmeister joined the resistance group in Berlin that was run by Harro Schulze-Boysen. Küchenmeister had known Schulze-Boysen since 1930, but had been reintroduced to him through Schumacher, sometime during 1935. Küchenmeister very quickly became an important member of the group working as a writer. He was tasked with writing the content for the production of leaflets and pamphlets for the resistance group. This was often mixed with additional content from KPD sources. He also collaborated in producing the leaflets, as well as organising fundraising amongst friends and collaborators to raise money to help political prisoners and provide political education to Berlin students.

In 1936 Küchenmeister, by now an invalid was receiving medical treatment for his tuberculosis from Elfriede Paul, a physician from Harburg who was also a communist and who had a medical practice at 63A Sächsischen Straße in Wilmersdorf. Kurt Schumacher a sculptor from Stuttgart had known Elfriede Paul from about 1923 and it was through him that Küchenmeister has been introduced to her. During 1936 and 1937, Küchenmeister and Paul had become good friends and subsequently, in March 1937 Küchenmeister abandoned his wife and moved in with Elfriede Paul who would intensively take-up the education of Küchenmeister's two sons.

In 1937 Gisela von Pöllnitz was arrested by the Gestapo and the resistance group fearing discovery and arrest, temporarily disbanded. Küchenmeister travelled to Cologne to be close to the Netherlands border, in case he had to flee across the border but the group's fears were unfounded as Pöllnitz was released after a few months without giving up any details of the group. In 1937 and 1938 Küchenmeister continued his resistance activities. For example, in October 1938 Küchenmeister together with Schulze-Boysen wrote the leaflet entitled Der Stoßtrupp The Shock Troop for the imminent affiliation of the Sudetenland. Around 50 copies were mimeographed and distributed.

By April 1939 Küchenmeister's tuberculosis has advanced so much that Paul advised him to attend a sanatorium, recommending alpine air. Paul had obtained a guarantee of a cure for Küchenmeister and hoped he would recover completely. Both Küchenmeister, Paul and the Schumacher's travelled to Leysin in Switzerland, finding the trip to be less suffocating than the Berlin under Nazi rule. The trip had a secondary agenda in that the small group were sent to meet the German actor, theatre and film director Wolfgang Langhoff, who represented the KPD in exile. The meeting did not go as planned as the KPD members were scattered to the wind due to Nazi purges and less inclined to listen to the message offered by the group of building and reactivating mass protests and building up their factory and regional bases. Indeed, they were dismissive of the group, calling them Ideologically dubious. The fact that Küchenmeister has been expelled from the KPD in 1926 didn't help the argument. After returning to Germany, Paul attempted a second trip June along with Gisela von Pöllnitz who also had tuberculosis, but this was also a failure.

Küchenmeister stayed in Switzerland for seven months receiving treatment at the sanatorium in Leysin. Elfriede Paul wrote to Kuchenmeister five times over the seven months.

While he was based in Switzerland, Küchenmeister had extensive contact with Fritz Sperling, one of the founders of the Free-Germany Movement the section head of the Southern section of the KPD. Sperling maintained contact with Paul, reporting the slow progress of his treatment.

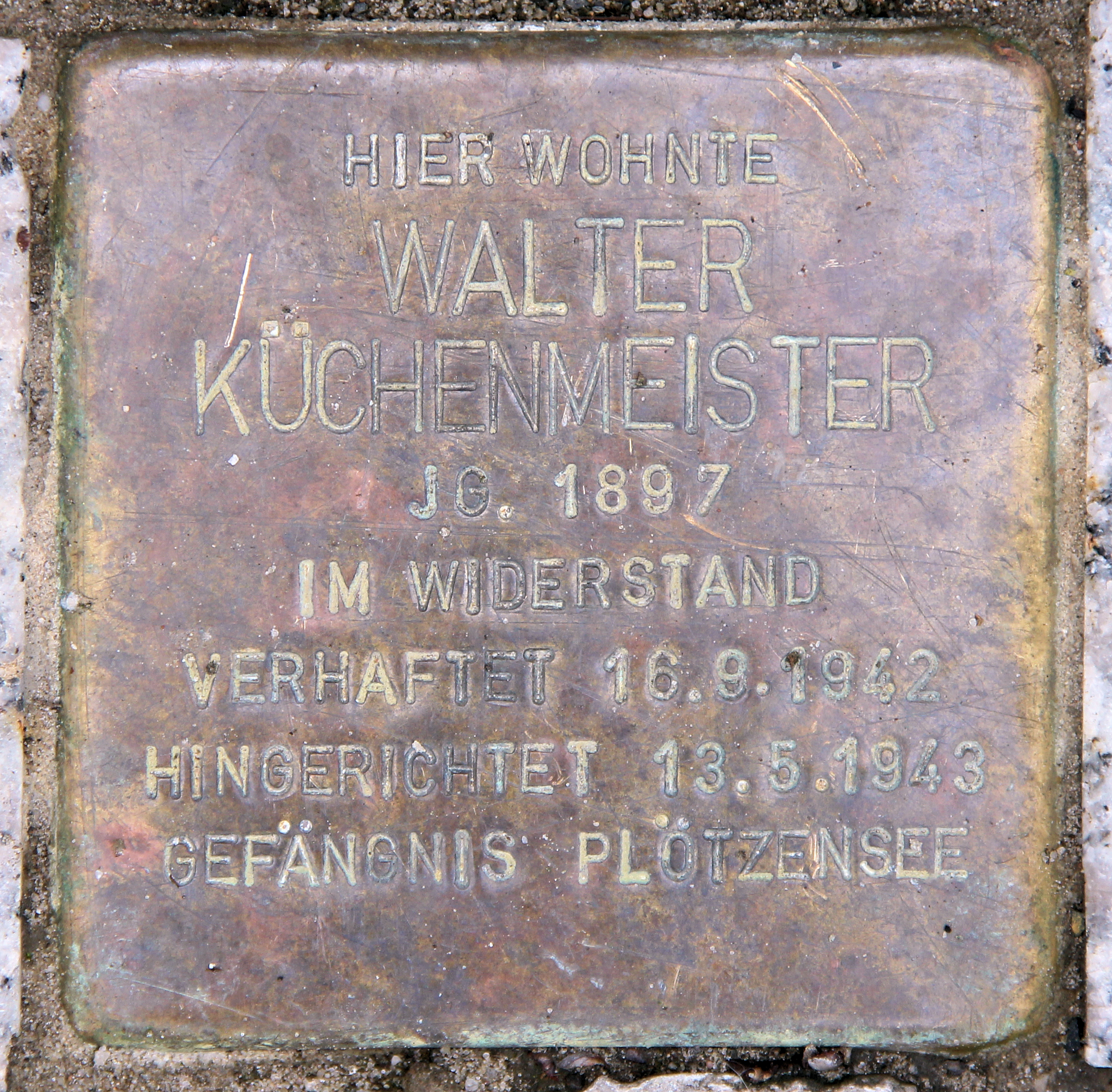
"Stolperstein" (stumbling block), Walter Küchenmeister, Sächsische Straße 63a, Berlin-Wilmersdorf, Germany.

In early 1940, Küchenmeister returned to Germany to continue his resistance activities. In October and November 1940, Schulze-Boysen in conversation with the economist Arvid Harnack who also ran a resistance organisation in Berlin and the journalist Adam Kuckhoff about information sheets that he prepared weekly on the situation in Germany, his connections in Germany and the leaflets that he received from those connections. Harnack had known Schulze-Boysen since 1935 or 1936, but each did not know the full extent of the other's network. In that conversation, Küchenmeister and Paul's names were mentioned. The Harnack organisation were suspicious of Küchenmeister, believing him to be a Gestapo agent or possibly watched by the Gestapo. They believed that as he had already been jailed he could have been possibly turned, but it was Wilhelm Guddorf who considered himself the only representative in the KPD group, who made the strongest argument and demanded of Schulze-Boysen that all ties with Küchenmeister and Paul be broken. Schulze-Boysen wasn't impressed with Guddorf's argument and instead consolidated his friendship with both Küchenmeister and Paul and at the time began to soften his relationship with Kurt Schumacher. Küchenmeister continued to resist the Nazi state in the next two years as a core member of the Schulze-Boysen group up until his arrest.

== Death ==
Küchenmeister and Paul were arrested on 16 September 1942. On 6 February 1943 Küchenmeister was sentenced to death by the 2nd Senate of the Imperial War Court for belonging to the resistance organisation, the Red Orchestra. Küchenmeister was executed on 13 May 1943 in Plötzensee Prison in Berlin. The 2nd senate of the Reichskriegsgericht sentenced Paul on 6 February 1943 to six years in prison for preparation for high treason.

Due to the German idea that the family shares responsibility for a crime, known as Sippenhaft, Küchenmeister son Rainer felt the brunt of Sippenhaft as he was jailed by the Nazis until the end of the war. He was sent to Moringen concentration camp and in March 1945, he was conscripted into strafbataillon, a penal battalion and survived the war. Rainer was perhaps the last person of the resistance to see Harro Schulze-Boysen alive, when he was being dragged past his cell window with both his hands heavily bandaged after screws were driven in each finger by the Gestapo. His other son Claus had managed to flee to Switzerland and evade capture.

== Film ==
After the war, Walter Küchenmeister's son Claus and his wife Wera decided to make a documentary about their father. They started to conduct interviews with former members of the Red Orchestra and when the East German Ministry of State Security's Department of Agitation heard about the project they provided access to their archives and provided previously undisclosed materials. No documentary was actually made, instead a full feature film was commissioned called KLK Calling PTZ – The Red Orchestra KLK Calling PTZ is the initial wireless telegraphy calling sequence that was used by members of the Red Orchestra when they needed to transmit information to Soviet intelligence.
