= Herbert Gollnow =

German counterintelligence officer during World War II

- Herbert Gollnow
- Born: 13 June 1911; Berlin, German Empire
- Died: 12 February 1943 (aged 31); Tegel Prison, Berlin, Nazi Germany
- Cause of death: Execution by firing squad
- Education: Deutsche Reichsbahn, Friedrich Wilhelm University
- Occupation(s): Luftwaffe officer, Diplomat
- Years active: April 1939-February 1943
- Movement: Member of the Red Orchestra ("Rote Kapelle")

Herbert Gollnow (* 13 July 1911 in Berlin, † 12 February 1943 in Berlin) was a German resistance fighter, consulate secretary and later second lieutenant in the Luftwaffe. Gollnow career was influenced by Harro Schulze-Boysen while Gollnow studied at the Faculty for Foreign Studies (Auslandswissenschaftliche Fakultät) of the Friedrich Wilhelm University in Berlin, and as he rose through the ranks of the Luftwaffe, he became a counter-intelligence officer in the Luftwaffe and an informer to Schulze-Boyen. Gollnow became a member of a Berlin anti-fascist resistance group that was associated with Schulze-Boysen, that was later called the Red Orchestra (Rote Kapelle). He was later arrested and executed in 1943.

== Life ==
Gollnow was the son of Reinhold Gollnow, a musician, and his wife Else. He had no siblings. After graduating from high school in March 1931, Gollnow began training with the Reichsbahn, working there from 1 May 1931 to 5 December 1938, achieving the rank of Reichsbahn inspector on 1 August 1938. His work in the railways was interrupted for a year training between May 1936 to June 1937, as a volunteer in the Luftwaffe learning to be a pilot, attaining the rank of Sargeant ("Feldwebel").

== Foreign Office ==
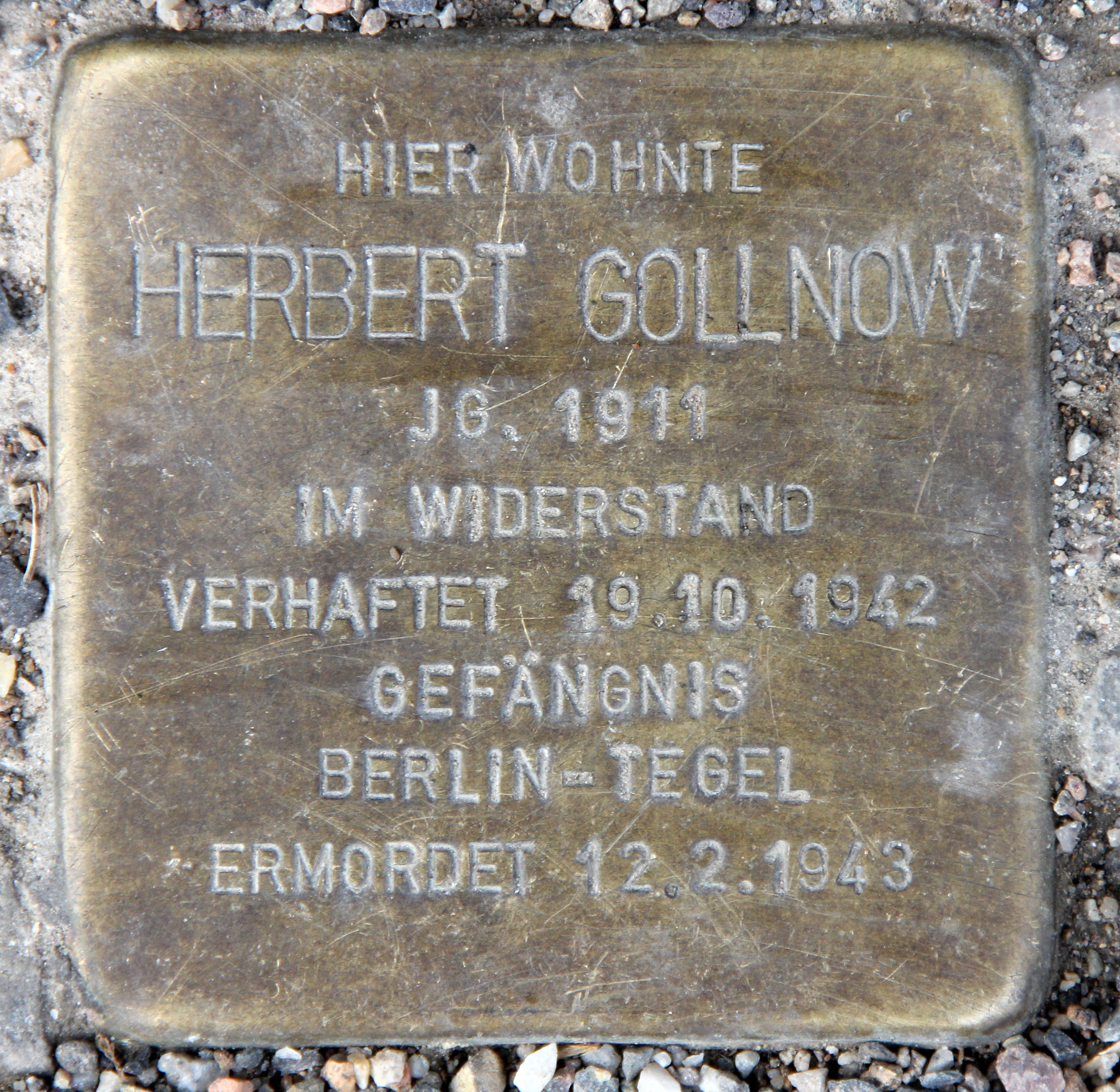
The Stolperstein ("stumbling stone") of Herbert Gollnow, located at 5 Feldzeugmeisterstraße, Moabit, Berlin

On 5 December 1938, Gollnow joined the Foreign Office to prepare for service as consulate secretary. On 19 August 1939 Gollnow was appointed consulate secretary by Foreign Minister Joachim von Ribbentrop.

Looking to learn the English language, so as to enable him to achieve a more senior position at the Foreign Office, Gollnow answered an advert by Jane Donner, the niece of Mildred Harnack that read Studentin unterrichtet Englisch, ihr Muttersprache in a Berlin newspaper. Gollnow was initially taught by Donner at the Faculty of Foreign Studies. but when she became too busy, she passed Gollnow onto Mildred Harnack, who taught him at her home. He became friends with the Mildred Harnack, an American professor of American English Literature. From April 1939, Gollnow studied part-time at the Institute of Foreign Affairs.

On 1 April 1939, Gollnow became a reserve officer in the Luftwaffe with the rank of second lieutenant. In June 1940, Gollnow was drafted to a Luftwaffe Jagdfliegerschule in Tutow where he taught aircraft identification. While there, he underwent paratrooper training. In the summer of 1941 he was promoted to first lieutenant. At Arvid Harnack's suggestion, Gollnow continued his studies at the institute. Gollnow met Harro Schulze-Boysen through Mildred Harnack. Under the guise of helping him, Schulze-Boysen became an influence on Gollnow in the hope of turning him into an informer. In October 1941, Gollnow was promoted to a position in The Foreign Branch of the Abwehr in the Oberkommando der Wehrmacht of the Armed Forces High Command. Looking to impress the Harnacks, resulted in gross carelessness as Gollnow gave away information on the Abwehr that should have remained secret. Eventually, he became an important source to both the Harnacks and Schulze-Boysen.

== Arrest and Trial ==
On 19 October 1942, Gollnow was arrested. On 19 December 1942, the 2nd senate of the Reichskriegsgericht sentenced Gollnow to death for disobedience in the field and disclosing state secrets to the enemy.

After the trial, Gollnow was separated from the imprisoned group and sent to Lehrterstrasse prison on 21 January 1943. Gollnow's execution was postponed so he could testify at the new trial of Mildred Harnack and Erika von Brockdorff.

== Execution ==
On 12 February 1943, Gollnow was executed by firing squad at Tegel Prison.
