= Elfriede Paul =

German physician and resistance fighter against the Nazi regime

Professor Elfriede Paul
- Photo for Elfriede Paul
- Born: 14 January 1900; Cologne
- Died: 30 August 1981 (aged 81); Ahrenshoop
- Education: Humboldt University of Berlin
- Occupation: Physician
- Partner: Walter Küchenmeister

Elfriede Paul (14 January 1900 – 30 August 1981) was a German physician and resistance fighter against the Nazi regime. Paul, a small and energetic woman, was a communist member of the anti-fascist resistance group that was later called the Red Orchestra by the Abwehr. Paul was one of the few members of the Red Orchestra Group to survive imprisonment at the hands of the Gestapo. After the war, she was responsible for drafting health policies for the German Democratic Republic.

== Life ==
Elfriede Paul came from a petite bourgeoisie family background and was the daughter of a lithographer. Between 1905 and 1915, she attended middle school in Görlitz and later Harburg. A visit to her father in the infirmary, who had been wounded during the war, and the lack of food during the last years of World War I, led her to contemplate the meaning of war.

Planning to be a fine artist while at school, she was inspired by the anthroposophical ideas of the Austrian philosopher Rudolf Steiner, but determined that she was unlikely to be successful, and would prefer to be an ordinary teacher rather than a mediocre artist.

After attending the lyceum in Harburg for a year, Paul started a teacher training course in 1917. She attended the monastery of St. Johannis in Hamburg and completed the First State Examination of teachers in 1921. In 1919, Paul joined the Free German Youth and, unsatisfied with the organization, joined the German Monist League. Due to urging from her childhood sweetheart, she became a communist and joined the Communist Party of Germany (KPD) in 1921. Paul found that the Communist Party had the emotional intellect that she had been looking for.

While working as a teacher in Hamburg, she started a medical degree in 1926. In 1930 and 1931, Paul worked in Vienna. Later she passed the Staatsexamen in Berlin and completed her degree in 1933. Between 1934 and 1936, Paul completed two years of general postgraduate medical training and then obtained a position at the Institute of Hygiene at the Humboldt University of Berlin to study.

In 1936, she was promoted to D.Phil with a thesis titled Die Beeinflussung der Menstruation durch das Landjahr (The Influence of Menstruation by the Land Year). In 1954, she completed her habilitation with a thesis titled Ursachen und Dauer der Arbeitsunfähigkeit bei der Frau (Causes and Duration of Incapacity for Women).

== Career ==
In July 1933, Paul received a tip that her house was going to be searched for banned literature. The Sturmabteilung officers arrived at 06:30, but found nothing. Paul left a copy of the Volkischer Beobachter on her desk to assuage their suspicions.

In 1934, Paul received her license to be a doctor. Between 1934 and 1937, Paul worked part time in the Municipal Office of Greater Berlin as a school doctor for infants. At the same time, she was an unpaid assistant in the Hygiene Institute of the University of Berlin.

From 1936 to 1939, Paul worked as a doctor for the League of German Girls, a Nazi organization. In 1936, Paul settled to become a general practitioner in Wilmersdorf. Reich Chamber of Culture official Hans Hinkel lived on the same floor as her practice. From 1936 to 1942, Paul continued her general practitioner career.

== Resistance ==
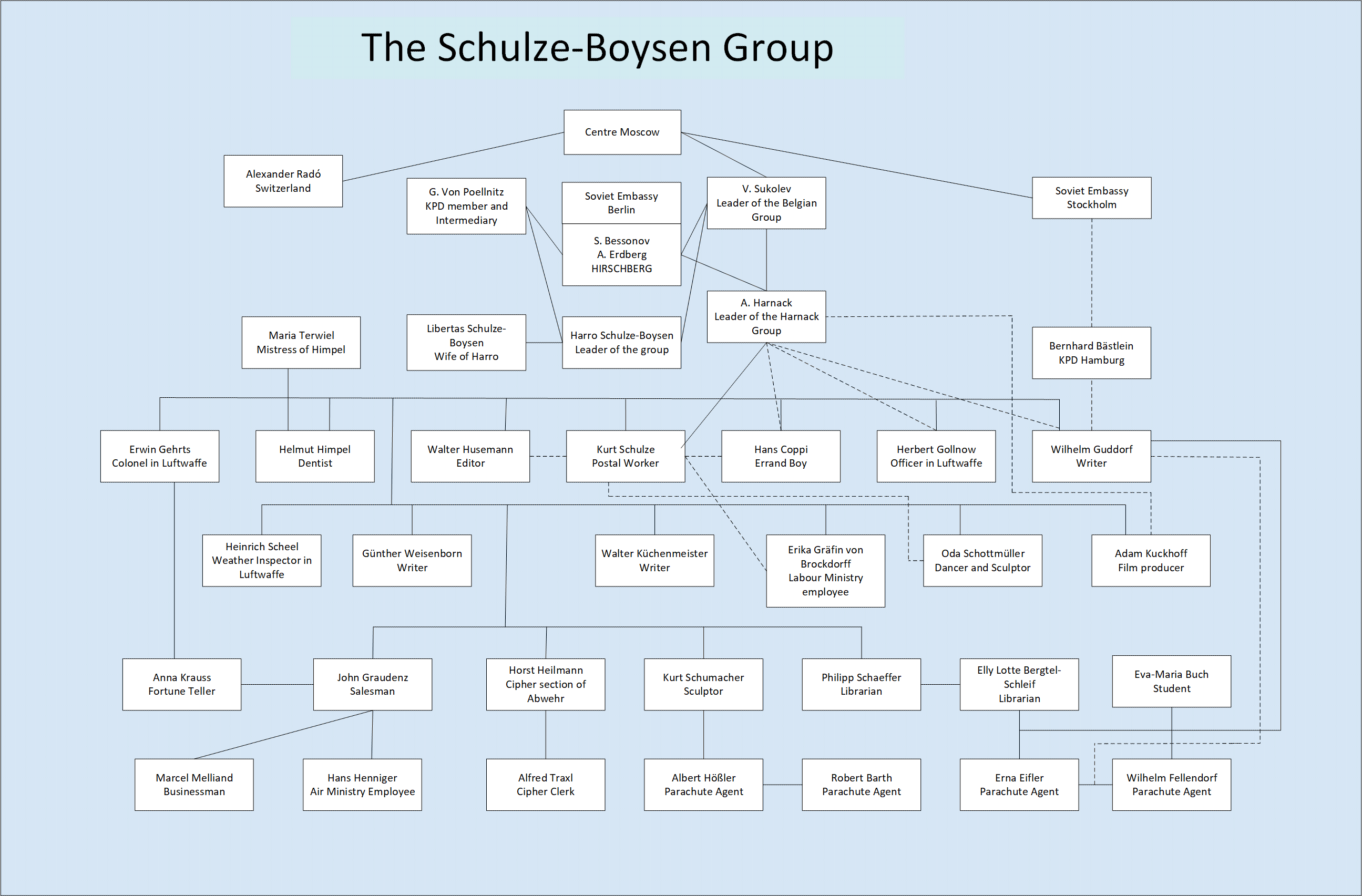
The Schulze-Boysen group in Germany

At the end of 1936, Libertas Schulze-Boysen and Walter Küchenmeister, on the advice of Elisabeth Schumacher, sought out Paul. Küchenmeister, Schumacher, and a Mr. Schwarz were selected to visit Paul's surgery waiting room. The conversation did not proceed in the waiting room, so Schwarz ordered Schumacher to introduce himself but Paul feared arrest and remained on guard and it was only slowly that her confidence was restored. Paul stated the following:

I think I should represent you, sir, and now you are appearing here yourself? The visitor, obviously amazed, does not seem to comprehend the situation. Why is he so embarrassed? His attitude is strangely uncertain anyway, as if he were bowed over, as if he had stomach pains.

Paul was right to be wary as Küchenmeister had already been arrested twice by 1936, once in 1933 and once in 1934, including a nine-month jail sentence spent in Sonnenburg concentration camp, where he was infected with tuberculosis. In 1936, Küchenmeister, by now an invalid, was receiving medical treatment for his tuberculosis from Paul. Küchenmeister and Paul had become good friends and, in March 1937, Küchenmeister abandoned his wife and moved in with Paul, who took up the education of Küchenmeister's two sons.

Beginning in 1937, the group began copying and disseminating leaflets and pamphlets from the waiting room of Paul's surgery in Wilmersdorf, using information about the Spanish Civil War received from Harro Schulze-Boysen. The group would target friends and acquaintances to try and make them aware of the "animalistic behaviour" of the Fascists. Secrecy was essential and even getting paper and stamps became difficult. Paul would drive around, under the guise of making house calls, and mail carefully disguised anonymous leaflets from distant post boxes.

In April 1939, Küchenmeister's tuberculosis had advanced so much that Paul advised him to attend a sanatorium, recommending alpine air. Paul had obtained a guarantee of a cure for Küchenmeister and hoped he would recover completely. Küchenmeister, Paul, and the Schumachers travelled to Leysin in Switzerland, finding the trip to be less suffocating than Berlin under Nazi rule. Küchenmeister stayed in Switzerland for seven months, receiving treatment at the sanatorium in Leysin. Paul wrote to Küchenmeister five times over the seven months. Over the next several years, Paul was intimately involved in the group.

== Arrest ==
On 16 September 1942, two Gestapo agents arrived at 6:30 in the morning. Küchenmeister knew what the arrival of the agents meant, and instructed Paul to switch off the fridge and to "come along". Paul, Küchenmeister and his son Rainer were arrested. Both Paul and Rainer were taken to a holding cell on Alexanderplatz. Paul was sentenced by the 2nd Senate of the Reichskriegsgericht on 6 February 1943 to six years in prison for "preparation for high treason".

Küchenmeister was taken to Dachau concentration camp. He was sentenced to death by the 2nd Senate of the Imperial War Court for belonging to the resistance organization, the Red Orchestra, and was executed on 13 May 1943 in Plötzensee Prison in Berlin. Due to the Nazi concept that the family shares responsibility for a crime, known as Sippenhaft, Küchenmeister's son Rainer was also jailed. He was sent to Moringen concentration camp, and in March 1945 was sent to strafbataillon, a penal battalion, and survived the war.

In February 1945, Paul, along with 300 other women, was transported in a cattle car to Leipzig. While imprisoned, she was allowed to volunteer in the prison hospital. She found 300 women patients in a hall in the hospital. The women had every disease imaginable and the place was full of vermin. While working as a doctor there, she contracted tuberculosis in her left lung. Due to the bombing, it was impossible to bury the dead, so she stacked the dead bodies in a shed in the hospital grounds.

== After World War II ==
On 7 May 1945, Paul and the rest of the prisoners were released when an American tank from the US 2nd Infantry Division drove through the garden wall. The tank crew released all the prisoners and gave what rations they could. After recovering, Paul returned to Berlin, now bombed to destruction. Paul started back to work as a physician but found it difficult to visit her patients in the American occupation zone and Soviet occupation zone, so she decided to go live with her sister Elsbeth in Burgdorf, Hanover.

During this period she worked for the reformation of the KPD in Hanover and the surrounding districts, as old colleagues returned from the concentration camps and prisons. After a two-week holiday in Burgdorf, she decided to settle there, when the KPD asked for her help, as they had insufficient staff in the Hanover officer and the Berlin KPD office was well staffed.

In 1945, Paul opened a practice and, with some help, she treated patients from Camp Ohio, a large resettlement camp close to Burgdorf that contained hundreds of women, children and old people. Paul stated of the experience:

I saw unspeakable misery. Primarily separated from each other by blankets, many families lived in a single large barrack, and there was no prospect of returning to their own home in the foreseeable future. The county seat [of] Burgdorf and certainly the villages of this Lower Saxon area had, as I said, barely known the horrors and hardships of the war. Most of the farmers were hard-hearted. They did not give the mothers a drop of milk for their children, not a piece of bread.

In 1946, Paul became a Minister for Construction, Labour and Welfare of the State of Hanover as a member of the Landtag of the Communist Party of Germany. The position only lasted for a year as Hanover was in the British Zone of Occupation and became part of Lower Saxony in 1946 and Paul's position as a member of the assembly was dissolved. On 1 May 1947, Paul returned to Berlin.

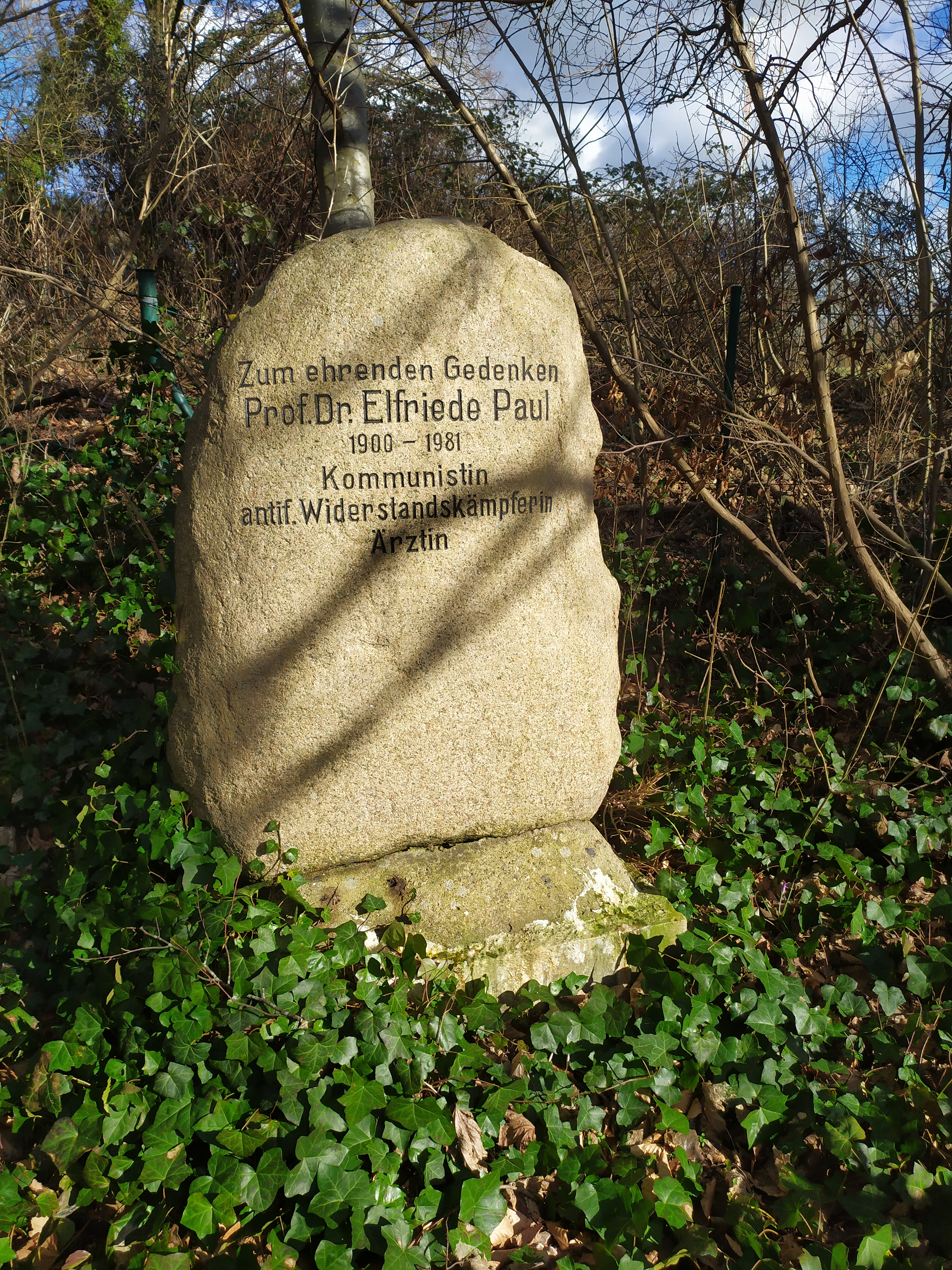
Gravestone in Ahrenshoop

For the next two years, Paul was director of the Division for Occupational Health Care in the German Economic Commission. The following year she was medical director of the Insurance Institute Berlin. In 1950, Paul returned to work at the Hygienic Institute of the University of Berlin, where she had been an assistant before the war. Paul remained in the position until 1954 when she was appointed as Head of the Occupational Health Inspectorate of the Health Department of the Berlin City Council. In 1956, Paul was appointed to the Chair of Social Hygiene at the Institute of Social Hygiene at the Medical Academy Magdeburg, the University of Magdeburg, which is now called the Otto von Guericke University Magdeburg.

In 1957, Paul also undertook a lectureship in occupational medicine at the Medical Academy Magdeburg. As a social hygienist, she included clinicians from various fields in the lecture series Occupational Hygiene. From 1960, she was also a city counsellor for Magdeburg. She retired in 1964.

== Awards and honours ==
- 1958: Hufeland Medal
- 1958: Medal for Fighters Against Fascism
- Patriotic Order of Merit in bronze (1959), silver (1965) and gold (1975)
- Honour clip for the Patriotic Order of Merit in Gold (1980)

Paul received the majority of the honours in the 1960s and 1970s.

- In Templin, the children's home, Elfriede Paul of Lebenshilfe, was named after her.
- On 13 October 2010, a Stolperstein, or stumbling block, was laid in front of their last house before the Gestapo arrested them in the Saxon Palace, located at 63a Sächsische Strasse in Wilmersdorf.

== Odonymy ==
- In Hanover, Paul has a street after her, called Elfriede Paul Alley (Elfriede-Paul-Allee).

== Bibliography ==
=== Red Orchestra ===
- Paul, Elfriede; Küchenmeister, Wera (1987). Ein Sprechzimmer der Roten Kapelle [A consulting room of the Red Orchestra] (in German) (3rd ed.). Berlin: Militärverlag der Deutschen Demokratischen Republik. ISBN 978-3-327-00421-0. OCLC 884412492.

=== Medical studies ===
This is a representative list of medical articles and books written or co-written by Paul.

- Paul, Elfriede (1956). Untersuchungen über Ursachen und Dauer der Arbeitsunfähigkeit bei der Frau; Analyse der gesundheitlichen Lage der werktätigen Frauen auf Grund von Erhebungen in sechs Berliner Betrieben [Studies on the causes and duration of inability to work for women; Analysis of the health status of working women based on surveys in six Berlin companies.] (in German). Berlin: Verlag Volk und Gesundheit. OCLC 14663198.
- Paul, Elfriede; Braun, Renate; Verlag Volk und Gesundheit, Berlin (1979). Gesundheitsschutz [Health]. Lehrbuch für die medizinische Fachschulausbildung (in German). OCLC 5764963.
- Elfriede, Paul; Kruschwitz, S; Zunk, S (1974). Gesundheitsschutz der Frau in unserer Landwirtschaft [Health protection of women in our agriculture]. Medicus:kleine medizinische Bücherei für alle (in German). Berlin: Verlag Volk u. Gesundheit, VEB. OCLC 1672864.
- Elfriede, Paul (1968). Organisation des Gesundheitsschutzes in der Deutschen Demokratischen Republik Einf. f. Lernende an medizin. Schulen [Organization of health protection in the German Democratic Republic Einf. F. Apprentices in medicine. schools] (in German). Berlin: Verl. Volk u. Gesundheit VEB. OCLC 73845723.
- Elfriede, Paul (1954). Silikose und Silikatose Zusammenstellg v. Arbeiten aus d. sowjet. Zeitschriftenliteratur (in German). Berlin: Verl. Volk u. Gesundheit. OCLC 72194641.
- Elfriede Paul (1967). Gesundheitliche und soziologische Probleme der berufstätigen Mutter: Arbeitstagung mit internationaler Beteiligung vom 27. - 29. Oktober 1966, Rostock [Health and sociological problems of the working mother: Workshop with international participation 27–29 October 1966, Rostock] (in German). Rostock: Deutsche Gesellschaft für die Gesamte Hygiene; Ges. für Gesundheitsschutz, Sekt. Hygiene u. Gesundheitsschutz d. Frau. OCLC 314021388.
- Paul, Elfriede; Schennetten, Felix P N (1959). Einführung in die kardiologische Dispensairebetreuung als Grundlage zur Rehabilitation [Introduction to cardiological dispensary care as a basis for rehabilitation] (in German). Berlin: VEB Verlag Volk und Gesundheit. OCLC 14623203.
- Elfriede, Paul; Lambert, Franziska (1947). Frau und Volkshochschule [Woman and community college]. Bausteine der Volkshochschule, H. 9. (in German). Braunschweig: Westermann. OCLC 73618882.
- Elfriede, Paul (1956). Grundzüge der Arbeitshygiene: Eine Schrift f. nichtärztl. Mitarb. d. Betriebsgesundheitswesens [Main features of occupational hygiene: A font f. nichtärztl. Al. d. Operating Outlet] (in German). Berlin: Verl. Tribüne. OCLC 73618887.
- Elfriede, Paul (1956). Untersuchungen über Ursachen und Dauer der Arbeitsunfähigkeit bei der Frau [Investigations on causes and duration of inability to work in the woman] (in German). Berlin: Verl. Volk u. Gesundheit. OCLC 252051007.
