= Heinrich Scheel (historian) =

German historian (1915–1996)

Scheel while at the Berlin Academy of Sciences

Heinrich Scheel (born 11 December 1915 in Kreuzberg; died 7 January 1996 in Berlin) was a German left-wing historian and longtime vice president of the East German Academy of Sciences and professor of modern history at Humboldt University of Berlin. Scheel was notable for putting forward a theory of the German radical at the time of the French revolution, in an attempt to determine an alternative tradition in Germany. Scheel was most notable for being a German resistance fighter against the Nazi regime, during World War II. He was a member of a Berlin-based anti-fascist resistance group that was later called the Red Orchestra ("Rote Kapelle") by the Abwehr, during the Nazi regime.

== Life ==
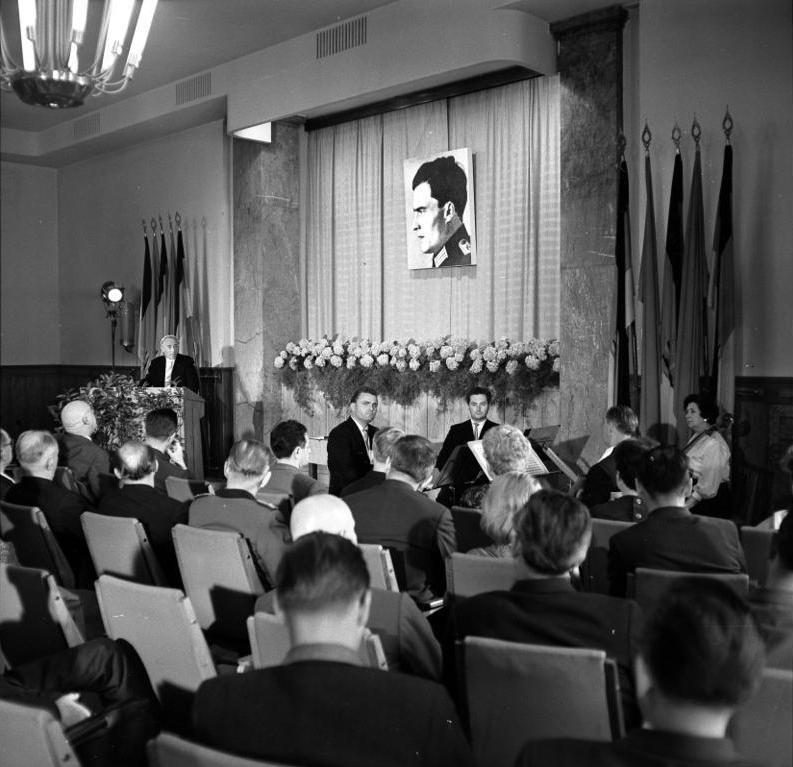
Commemoration ceremony for the 20th anniversary of the assassination attempt on Hitler. The speaker was Heinrich Scheel

Scheel grew up in a dedicated working class, social democratic family. He was significantly influenced by attending the Schulfarm Insel Scharfenberg, a boarding school located on an island in Lake Tegel and modeled on the German rural boarding school movement. Scheel attended the school from 1929 to 1934. This resulted in him forming an opposition to Nazism. Together with his classmates Hans Coppi and Hans Lautenschläger, they began to resist the Nazis. In 1932, Scheel joined the Communist Youth Association of Germany (KJVD).

=== Red Orchestra ===
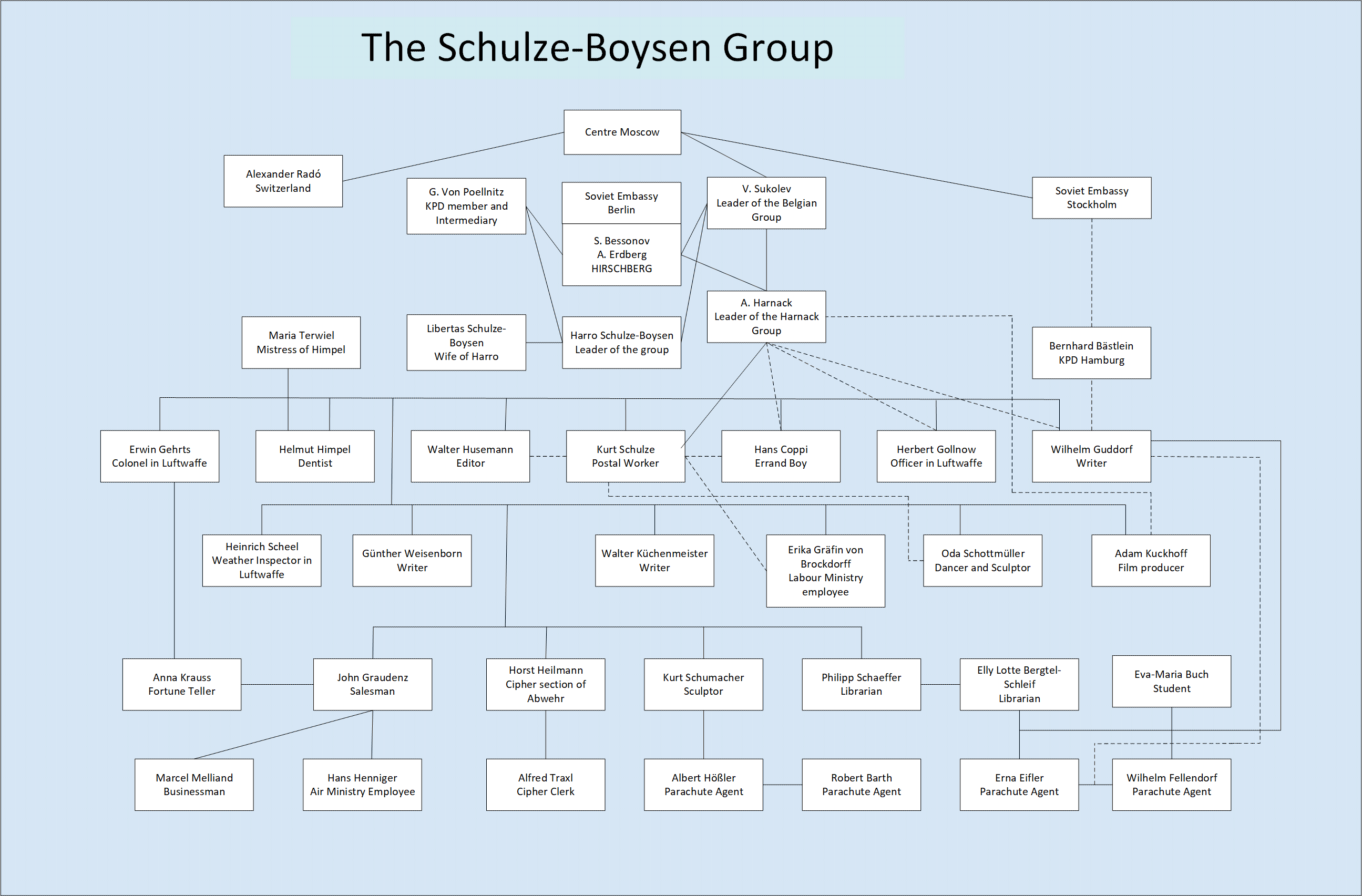
The Schulze-Boysen group in Germany

Scheel meet Harro Schulze-Boysen and Kurt Schumacher via the librarian Lotte Bergtel-Schleif who had known Scheel since 1930. Scheel and his friends questioned the meaning of the newly signed Molotov–Ribbentrop Pact and wanted to discuss this measure with the politically experienced Schulze-Boysen. Schulze-Boysen had defended the pact and in the course of this encounter got in touch with several friends around Scheel and Hans Coppi who was also part of the anti-fascist resistance group. Due to Coppi being arrested and sent to Oranienburg concentration camp in January 1934 and being found unfit for drafting into military service, Scheel agreed to form contacts with other resistance groups. Scheel eventually became the liaison man between Coppi and Schulze-Boysen.

On 16 September 1942, Scheel was arrested in Berlin but escaped a death penalty due to offering an ingenious defence to the Reichskriegsgericht that saved his life. He was sentenced to five years imprisonment.

Scheel was sent to prison at Aschendorf in Lower Saxony, but in July 1944 after a year of forced labour, he was put on probation and sent to a Strafbataillon penal battalion, due to the chronic lack of suitable men for the front, at the time. At the end of 1944, he was captured and sent to an American prisoner of war camp.

=== Red Orchestra reappraisal ===
For much of the period that encompassed the Cold War, the Red Orchestra was seen as a distinctly communist organisation that was beholden to the Soviet Union. In the 1970s there was a growing interest in the various forms of resistance and opposition. However, no group was so systematically misinformed and recognised as little as the resistance groups around Arvid Harnack and Harro Schulze-Boysen.

Between 1984 and 1990, Heinrich Scheel's analysed the Red orchestra and constructed a more nuanced picture of different groups. In the process, Scheel discovered the work that was done to defame them both during the war and afterwards. Scheel's paper triggered a reevaluation of the Red Orchestra both in Germany and the world, but it was not until 2009 that the German Bundestag overturned the judgments of the National Socialist judiciary for "treason" and rehabilitated the members of the Rote Kapelle.

== Career ==
From 1935 to 1940, Scheel studied German Philology, History and English at the Friedrich Wilhelm University of Berlin. In 1939, Scheel was conscripted into the Wehrmacht and was posted as a weather service inspector (German:Wetterdienst-Inspekteur) by the Luftwaffe in the Tempelhof area of Berlin, and later posted to the Rangsdorf area for a similar assignment.

Scheel spent the first year after the war unemployed, then in 1946 became an assistant of the Schulfarm Insel Scharfenberg. In 1947, Scheel undertook education management training by Wilhelm Blume and became the principal of Schulfarm Insel Scharfenberg, a position he held until 1949. However, he was dismissed for being a member of the Sozialistische Einheitspartei Deutschlands and charged of communist infiltration in the school. Scheel then returned to Humboldt University of Berlin to study English and History. Scheel was awarded a Doctor of Philosophy with a dissertation on the popular revolutionary movement in south-western Germany from 1795 to 1801 on the 12 March 1956. In 1960, Scheel habilitated with a thesis on the South German Jacobins.

From 1949 to 1956, Scheel was Member, Division Head and then deputy director of the Institute of History at the Academy of Sciences. In 1960, Scheel was promoted to Professor of German History at Humboldt University of Berlin. From 1972 to 1984, Scheel was the Vice President of the Academy of Sciences. From 1980 to 1990, Scheel was president of the Historians Society of the GDR (German:Historiker-Gesellschaft der DDR)

== Bibliography ==
- Die revolutionär-demokratischen Volksbewegungen in Südwestdeutschland von 1795 bis 1801 (The revolutionary democratic popular movements in southwest Germany from 1795 to 1801). Berlin, Humboldt-Universität, Phil. Fakultät, Dissertation vom 21. März 1956.
- Süddeutsche Jakobiner. Klassenkämpfe und republikanische Bestrebungen im deutschen Süden Ende des 18. Jahrhunderts (South German Jacobins. Class struggles and republican aspirations in the German South in the end of the 18th) . Akademie-Verlag, Berlin 1962.
- Jakobinische Flugschriften aus dem deutschen Süden Ende des 18. Jahrhunderts (Jacobin pamphlets from the German south in the end of the 18th). Akademie-Verlag, Berlin 1965.
- Deutscher Jakobinismus und Deutsche Nation (German Jacobinism and German Nation). Ein Beitrag zur nationalen Frage im Zeitalter der Grossen Französischen Revolution. Akademie-Verlag, Berlin 1966.
- Biographisches Lexikon zur deutschen Geschichte (Biographical lexicon on German history). Von den Anfängen bis 1917. Deutscher Verlag der Wissenschaften, Berlin 1967 (mit Karl Obermann).
- Schulfarm Insel Scharfenberg (School farm island Scharfenberg). Volk u. Wissen, Berlin 1990, ISBN 3-06-204136-6.
- Vor den Schranken des Reichskriegsgerichts (Before the barriers of the Imperial War Court). Mein Weg in den Widerstand. Edition q, Berlin 1993, ISBN 3-86124-147-1.
- Vom Leiter der Berliner Schulfarm Scharfenberg zum Historiker des deutschen Jakobinismus (From head of Berlin's Scharfenberg school farm to historian of German Jacobinism) (1946–1956). Autobiographische Aufzeichnungen. Becker, Velten 1996, ISBN 3-89597-313-0.

== Literature ==
- Dietmar Haubfleisch: Schulfarm Insel Scharfenberg. Mikroanalyse der reformpädagogischen Unterrichts- und Erziehungsrealität einer demokratischen Versuchsschule im Berlin der Weimarer Republik (= Studien zur Bildungsreform, 40), Frankfurt u. a. 2001, ISBN 3-631-34724-3.
- Gert Rosiejka: Die Rote Kapelle. "Landesverrat" als antifaschistischer Widerstand. Mit einer Einführung von Heinrich Scheel. ergebnisse, Hamburg 1986, ISBN 3-925622-16-0.

== Awards and honours ==
- 1966 Friedrich Engels Prize of the German Academy of Sciences
- 1975 Patriotic Order of Merit in gold.
- 1980 Order of Karl Marx
- 1985 Honorary clasp to Patriotic Order of Merit in gold.
