= Harro Schulze-Boysen =

German officer and resistance fighter (1909–1942)

- Harro Schulze-Boysen at his work desk
- Born: Heinz Harro Max Wilhelm Georg Schulze; 2 September 1909; Kiel, Province of Schleswig-Holstein, Kingdom of Prussia, German Empire
- Died: 22 December 1942 (aged 33); Plötzensee Prison, Berlin, Nazi Germany
- Occupations: Publicist; Luftwaffe Officer
- Movement: Member of the Red Orchestra ("Rote Kapelle")
- Spouse: Libertas Haas-Heye (m. 1936)
- Military career
- Allegiance: Nazi Germany
- Branch: Luftwaffe
- Service years: 1936–1942
- Rank: Oberleutnant
- Unit: Ministry of Aviation
- Conflicts: World War II

Heinz Harro Max Wilhelm Georg Schulze-Boysen (German: [ˈha.ʁoː ˈʃʊl.t͡sə ˈbɔɪ̯sn̩]; né Schulze, 2 September 1909 – 22 December 1942) was a left-wing German publicist and Luftwaffe officer during World War II. As a young man, Schulze-Boysen grew up in prosperous family with two siblings, with an extended family who were aristocrats. After spending his early schooling at the Heinrich-von-Kleist Gymnasium and his summers in Sweden, he partly completed a political science course at the University of Freiburg, before moving to Berlin in November 1929, to study law at the Humboldt University of Berlin. At Humboldt, he became an anti-Nazi. After a visit to France in 1931, he moved to the political left. When he returned, he became a publicist on Der Gegner (English: "The Opponent"), a left-leaning political magazine. In May 1932, he took control of the magazine, but it was closed by the Gestapo in February 1933.

In May 1933, Schulze-Boysen trained as a pilot and started working in the Ministry of Aviation. In the summer of 1934, he met the aristocrat Libertas Haas-Heye and married her in July 1936. The couple held regular dinner parties and evening-picnics that became formal meetings where many people from different stratas of society met and who were confessed anti-Nazis. By 1936, their house in Charlottenburg had become a popular meeting place and by 1937 the group began to resist. During the Spanish Civil War, Schulze-Boysen began collecting details of the Wehrmacht's involvement in the war from the ministry. He arranged for the documents to be passed to the Soviet embassy by Gisela von Pöllnitz. As he was promoted in the Ministry, Schulze-Boysen collected information that he used to write savage indictments of the Nazi plans. Their first leaflet was "Der Stoßtrupp" ("The Shock Troop") that criticised the plan for the invasion of Sudetenland. At the time, the documents were taken abroad.

At the beginning of the war, Schulze-Boysen met Arvid Harnack who was the leader of another political faction and they started to work together. As the war progressed their combined undercover political faction, developed from a resistance organisation into an espionage network from a small cadre of close friends, that began to collaborate with Soviet intelligence. The espionage network, led by Schulze-Boysen lasted slightly longer than a year, from just before June 1941 to August 1942 before a blunder by Soviet intelligence exposed their names and addresses to the German Funkabwehr, which resulted in the arrest of many members of the group, including Schulze-Boysen who was arrested on 31 August 1942 and executed later the same year.

== Early life ==
Schulze-Boysen was born in Kiel as the son of decorated naval officer Erich Edgar Schulze and Marie-Luise (née Boysen). On his paternal side he was the grandnephew of Grand Admiral Alfred von Tirpitz and on the maternal side, the German economist and philosopher Ferdinand Tönnies. In 1913, the family moved to Berlin when his father received a posting. He had two siblings: a sister Helga, and a brother, Hartmut (1922-2013).

In 1913, Schulze-Boysen attended primary school and later the Heinrich-von-Kleist-Gymnasium in the district of Schmargendorf in Berlin. From 1920, he regularly spent his summer holidays with the Hasselrot family in Sweden. In 1922 his father was transferred to Duisburg, and Harro followed him in the autumn. As a student at the Steinbart Gymnasium in Duisburg, he participated in the underground struggle against the French occupation of the Ruhr in 1923 and was temporarily imprisoned by the French and Belgian occupying forces. To get him out of this political firing line, his parents organized a slightly longer stay in Sweden. Harro's trip to England in 1926 had inspired comparison and reflection. He had found that his experiences in the country did not match the perception of England within Germany.

In 1927 he wrote his first major newspaper report about a scandal in Duisburg to erect a monument to the sculptor Wilhelm Lehmbruck. On the occasion of the 80th birthday of the Reich President Paul von Hindenburg, Schulze-Boysen gave a commemorative speech at the school. His political involvement in high school was perceived as unusually intense. He passed the Abitur with the overall rating "good". His dexterity was particularly emphasized in the written and oral expression. At the time his spiritual attitude was in agreement with the values and traditions of the family. From then on, he appeared in public and in written statements with the double name Schulze-Boysen.

== Political awakening ==
In April 1928 he studied law and political science at the University of Freiburg and later Berlin, without finishing. In the same period he joined the Studentenverbindung Albingia and the Young German Order, a paramilitary organisation that influenced him ideologically at the time. Its goal was to ethically revive the "comradeship from the trenches of the First World War" as a model for the Volksgemeinschaft to be developed. It rejected any form of dictatorship from the ideological left or right.

In the summer of 1929 he participated in an academic fencing club at the university and a course from the Hochsee-Wehrsportverein high sea defense sailing club in Neustadt. In November he moved to the Humboldt University of Berlin to continue his studies in law and joined its International Students' Association. In 1930, Schulze-Boysen supported the intellectual-nationalist group called the Volksnationale Reichsvereinigung ("People's National Reich Association"). During this period, Schulze-Boysen was also a member of the National Socialist Black Front. For the first time during this period he dealt intensively with Nazi ideology and searched for the causes of the sudden victory of the Nazi Party in Reichstag elections in March 1933. He studied the Nazi Party's programme and read Mein Kampf in search of answers, describing it as a "jumble of platitudes" and commenting: "There's nothing here but nonsense". It became clear to him that a further gain in votes by the Nazis would lead to a sharp intensification and polarization in society.

== As a publicist ==
In July 1931, during a stay in France, Schulze-Boysen met French intellectuals associated with the magazine Plans, which sought the establishment of a Europe-wide collective economic system and whose influence resulted in him being reorientated politically to the left, though he still maintained his contacts with the nationalists. As time went on, he increasingly distanced himself from the views of the Young German Order as he realised that the daily struggle in Germany should primarily be directed against the emerging fascism and all reactionaries.

In 1932 and 1933, he published the left-liberal political magazine Der Gegner (English: "The Opponent"), that sought an alternative between capitalism and communism. It was founded in 1931 by Franz Jung and modelled on the Plans magazine. The poet Ernst Fuhrmann, the artist Raoul Hausmann, the writers Ernst von Salomon and Adrien Turel and the Marxist theoretician Karl Korsch, among others collaborated in writing the magazine. Their aim was to build a unified front of young people against the "liberal, capitalist and nationalist spirit" in Europe. For the French, Schulze-Boysen was the actor for Germany in this field. He tried to develop an independent German youth movement with the "Gegner-Kreis", which included Robert Jungk, Erwin Gehrts, Kurt Schumacher and Gisela von Pöllnitz and began to organize Enemy Evenings in Berlin cafés. "There was hardly an opposition youth group with which he did not keep in touch with." At the end of 1931, he took a leave of absence from his studies because he had come to the conclusion that the contents discussed here had nothing to do with the daily political disputes. In February 1932, Schulze-Boysen, in coordination with his French partners of Plans, organized the Treffen der revolutionären Jugend Europas or Meeting of Europe's Revolutionary Youth. A total of about 1,000 young people attended the meeting and he formulated the political goals for the German delegation. In view of the crisis in Germany, these consisted of the abolition of the capitalist system and also the assertion of Germany's own role without foreign diktat and interference.

In the search for alternatives to crisis-ridden Western Europe, he became more interested in the Soviet system, which was influenced by his disappointment with the national and conservative parties in Germany, who in his opinion did not fight the nascent Nazis enough. In March 1932, he wrote his first article, "Der Neue Gegner" (English: "The New Opponent") that defined his concept of publication goals, stating: "Let us serve the invisible alliance of thousands, who today are still divided." In April 1932, he wrote a letter to his mother that stated his goal was the intellectual reconciliation of the young generation. Essentially his politics were driven by the idea of a united youth fighting the older generations.

In May 1932, an investigation was opened against Jung and the office premises of the Der Gegner were sealed. Schulze-Boysen took over the business as the new editor and gave the publication a new name, Gegner (English: "opponent"), but with the same network of the most diverse political camps. At the depths of the crisis, he saw a clear opportunity to implement a new policy approach: "Opponents of today – comrades of tomorrow". He had become the leading head and the centre of the "enemy circle". Schulze-Boysen considered the seizure of power by Adolf Hitler to be probable at that time, but believed that he would soon be overthrown by a general strike. After the seizure of power by the Nazis and the Reichstag fire in Berlin, Schulze-Boysen helped several friends and colleagues who were being threatened to escape abroad. As early as February 1933 the Gestapo had rated the actions of the magazine as "radical" in an official communication, and in April 1933, the offices of Der Gegner were destroyed by the Sturmabteilung in a raid and detained all those present. The editorial staff were deported to a special camp of the 6th SS-Standarte. Schulze-Boysen himself was severely abused and detained for several days. The Sturmabteilung tortured his Jewish friend and colleague Henry Erlanger before his eyes, who died shortly afterwards. It had become clear to him, as a self-confessed anti-Nazi that he had to find new ways to implement his convictions. A chance encounter in the street led to Schulze-Boysen meeting the sculptor Kurt Schumacher, who had been working on Gegner with him. This was the beginning of the intellectual discussion group that would change into a direct-action, anti-fascist resistance group.

== Military ==
In May 1933, his father organized a pilot training course for him at the German Aviation School in Warnemünde as a sea observer to remove his son from the political front line in Berlin. The place was far away from Berlin and provided enough opportunity to allow Schulze-Boysen to reflect on his past and enable him to prepare plans for the future. Before his departure, he advised his friends and colleagues to look around Nazi Germany and to go into the institutions of the Nazi regime. He read books that the rulers appealed to and tried to return with due caution to his published work. In the spring of 1934, this resulted in an opportunity through a contact with the publisher Erich Röth. He published the magazine Wille zum Reich under a pseudonym and dealt with cultural policy issues but with the goal of undermining the Nazi movement with its own themes.

Every fortnight he held picnic-evenings in his apartment with interested parties in which they discussed philosophical and well as political questions. Under a pseudonym (presumably under the abbreviation E.R. for Erich Röth), Schulze-Boysen wrote individual editorials and essays. It was important for him to explore what possibilities of influence existed with regard to the new situation. From 10 April 1934 onwards, he was employed as an auxiliary officer in the fifth department, in the section Foreign Air Powers of the Ministry of Aviation (German: Reichsluftfahrtministerium) (RLM) in Berlin. As an adjutant of the head of maritime aviation intelligence, he was responsible for evaluating the foreign literature and press on the subject of air armament. He analysed tactics, organisation, training and technology by studying foreign magazines, lectures, photo collections and journals.

== Marriage ==
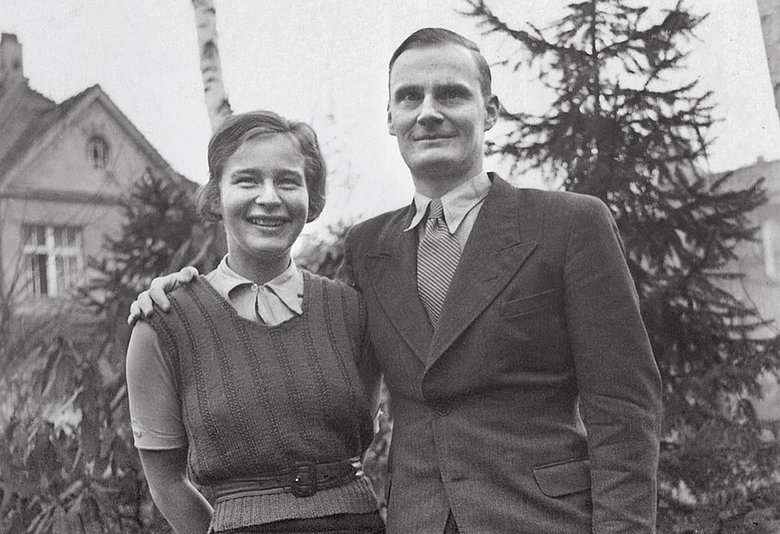
Harro and Libertas in 1935

To protect himself from further persecution, Schulze-Boysen surrounded himself with a group of politically incorruptible friends who were left-leaning anti-fascists, among them artists, pacifists and Communists. In the summer of 1934, he met 20-year-old Libertas Haas-Heye while they were sailing on the Wannsee, who worked at Metro-Goldwyn-Mayer in Berlin as a press officer.

They married on 16 July 1936. The wedding took place in the chapel of Liebenberg Castle under a painting of Guido Reni, with Hermann Göring giving away the bride. Liebenberg Castle was the ancestral estate of her parents. Schulze-Boysen spent his honeymoon in Stockholm as a language study trip for his employer and he submitted a confidential report upon his return. Haas-Heye was an impulsive woman of great personal ambition: she held evening discussions at her house, where she sought to influence her guests on behalf of Schulze-Boysen. She was fully aware of his activities in the resistance and supported the group by taking part in writing pamphlets, acting as a courier and helping to establish social contacts. Schulze-Boysen considered himself a libertine and the couple had an open marriage.

== Schulze-Boysen's friends ==
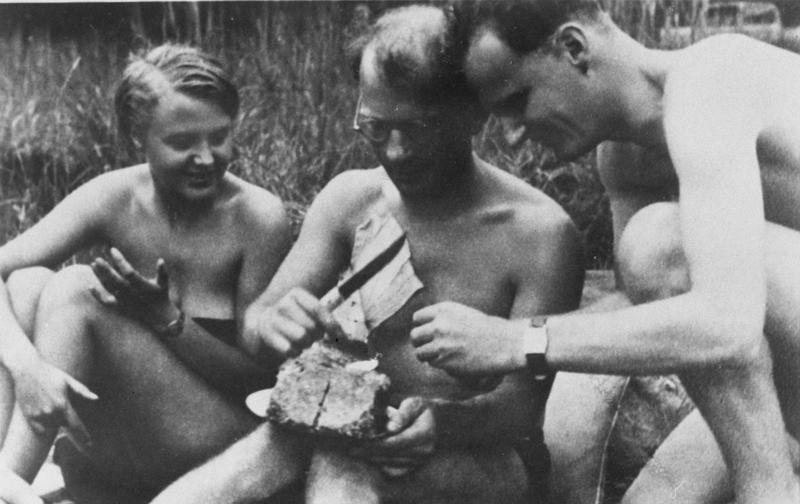
Harro Schulze-Boysen (right) with Marta Husemann and Günther Weisenborn

In 1935, Walter Küchenmeister joined the group. Küchenmeister had known Schulze-Boysen since 1930, but had been reintroduced to him through Kurt Schumacher. Küchenmeister very quickly became an important member of the group and assumed the position of writer. In the same year, Schulze-Boysen visited Geneva, disguised as a private trip, for a series of lectures on international legal issues. The playwright Günther Weisenborn had known Schulze-Boysen since 1932 when he had met him at a left-wing student gathering and had become good friends. In 1937 Weisenborn had introduced the actor Marta Wolter to Schulze-Boysen and became part of the group. Walter Husemann, who at the time was in the Buchenwald concentration camp, would marry Marta Wolter and join the group. Other friends were found by Schulze-Boysen among former students of a reform school on the island of Scharfenberg in Berlin-Tegel. They often came from communist or social democratic workers' families, e.g. Hans and Hilde Coppi, Heinrich Scheel, Hermann Natterodt and Hans Lautenschlager. Some of these contacts existed before 1933, for example through the German Society of Intellectuals. John Rittmeister's wife Eva was a good friend of Liane Berkowitz, Ursula Goetze, Friedrich Rehmer, Maria Terwiel and Fritz Thiel who met in the 1939 abitur class at the secondary private school, Heil'schen Abendschule at Berlin W 50, Augsburger Straße 60 in Schöneberg. The Romanist Werner Krauss also joined. Through discussions, an active resistance to the Nazi regime grew. Ursula Goetze, who was part of the group, provided contacts with the communist groups in Neukölln.

== Approaching war ==
In January 1936, Schule-Boyzen completed basic military training in the 3rd Radio Intelligence Teaching Company in Halle and was promoted to corporal. In order to be promoted, he had to either prove an academic degree or take part in a reservist exercise. However, the Luftwaffe Personnel Office blocked this possibility because he was registered in the files as "politically unreliable". In September 1936 Hermann Göring asked the head of the human resources department, Colonel General Hans-Jürgen Stumpff, what reports they had on Schulze-Boysen. When he learned that Schulze-Boysen's political activities from the Weimar Era "would offer no guarantee of a positive attitude towards the National State", Göring replied that "the old calibre of new appointments should be accepted" and sent him on an aviator course. He completed his course in November in List on Sylt and was subsequently promoted to sergeant of the Reserve. Further courses followed in May and July 1936. In the meantime, he was also commissioned by the Reich Aviation Ministry to work on the handbook of the military sciences and the Luftwaffe magazine.

While he was taking his basic military training in Halle, he learned of the ban on the magazine Wille zum Reich. The atelier that he and Libertas had purchased together in Charlottenburg as their wedding apartment gradually became a popular meeting place for people who wanted to maintain social interactions with one another. A second discussion group developed in Libertas' parents' estate, in Liebenberg. Many former acquaintances from Der Gegner were also present. To safeguard these covered activities, some basic conspiratorial rules were agreed. Schulze-Boysen's code name was Hans when he attended these regular discussion groups.

== Resistance ==
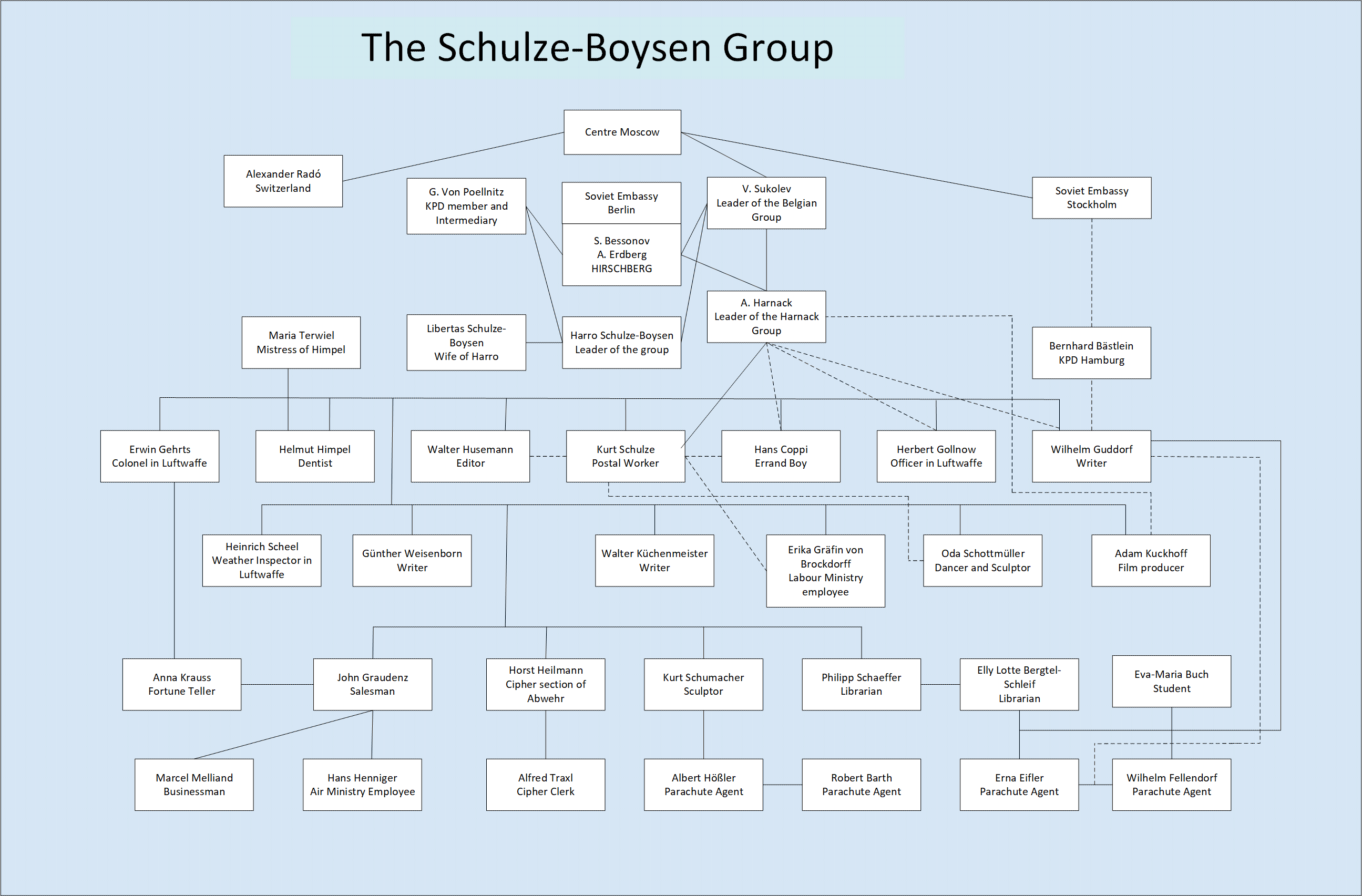
The Schulze-Boysen espionage group in Germany

During the summer of 1936, Schulze-Boysen had become preoccupied by the Popular Front in Spain and through his position at the Reich Aviation Ministry, had collected detailed information of the support that Germany was providing. The documents were passed to the Antimilitarist Apparatus or AM-Apparat (Intelligence organisation) of the Communist Party of Germany.

At the end of 1936, Libertas Schulze-Boysen and Walter Küchenmeister, on the advice of Elisabeth Schumacher—wife of Kurt Schumacher—sought out Elfriede Paul, a doctor, who became a core member of the group.

The Spanish Civil War galvanised the inner circle of Schulze-Boysen's group. Kurt Schumacher demanded that action should be taken and a plan that took advantage of Schulze-Boysen's position at the ministry was formed. In February 1937, Schulze-Boysen compiled a short information document about a sabotage enterprise planned in Barcelona by the German Wehrmacht. It was an action from "Special Staff W", an organisation established by Luftwaffe general Helmuth Wilberg to study and analyse the tactical lessons learned by the Legion Condor during the Spanish Civil War. The unit also directed the German relief operations that consisted of volunteers, weapons and ammunition for General Francisco Franco's FET y de las JONS. The information that Schulze-Boysen collected included details about German transports, deployment of units and companies involved in the German defence. The group around Schulze-Boysen did not know how to deliver the information to the Soviets, but discovered that Schulze-Boysen's cousin, Gisela von Pöllnitz, was planning to visit the Exposition Internationale des Arts et Techniques dans la Vie Moderne that was held in Paris from 25 May to 25 November 1937. After extensive discussion the group decided that she would deliver the letter to the Soviet Embassy in Paris. Von Pöllnitz fulfilled her mission and placed the letter in the mailbox of the Soviet Embassy on the Bois de Boulogne. However, the building was being watched by the Gestapo and after posting the letter they arrested her in November 1937.

To prepare for the upcoming military occupation of Czechoslovakia, just after 5 June 1938, a game of planning took place in the Foreign Air Powers Department and shortly afterwards in August a combat exercise took place in the Wildpark-Werder area that is directly southwest of Potsdam. The Gestapo also prepared for the impending war and, with orders from Heinrich Himmler, updated their registers of potential enemies of the state. Schulze-Boysen was classified as a former editor of the Gegner and they were aware of his status. On 20 April 1939, he was promoted to lieutenant and promptly called upon to perform a study on the comparison of air armaments between France, England and Germany.

The overall situation in Germany, which was moving more and more towards the state of war, did not leave the actors associated with Schulze-Boysen idle. In October 1938 Küchenmeister and Schulze-Boysen wrote the leaflet entitled Der Stoßtrupp (English: "The Shock Troop") for the imminent affiliation of the Sudetenland. Around 50 copies were mimeographed and distributed. In the spring of 1939, Paul, the Schumachers and Küchenmeister travelled to Switzerland, ostensibly to treat Küchenmeister's tuberculosis but also to contact the KPD director Wolfgang Langhoff to exchange information. In August, Schumacher along with Küchenmeister helped Rudolf Bergtel reach Switzerland. He also provided him with information on current German aircraft and tank production, as well as deployment plans for a German submarine base in the Canary Islands.

On his 30th birthday on 2 September 1939, Schulze-Boysen had talked with German industrialist Hugo Buschmann, with whom he had agreed to receive literature on the Russian Revolution, Lenin, Stalin, and Leon Trotsky. Schulze-Boysen was primarily concerned with questions of what alternatives there were to the capitalist system of the Western European countries, and he considered writing his thesis on the Soviet Union during his studies. Schulze-Boysen invalidated the concerns that Buschmann had regarding the literature handover by remarking, "I regularly receive Pravda and Izvestia and have to read them because I am a rapporteur on Russian issues. My department requires a thorough study of this literature. Besides, we are allies of Soviet Russia".

Schulze-Boysen spent much of 1940 looking for new contacts. Besides his work in the RLM, he studied at the Deutsche Hochschule für Politik of the Humboldt University of Berlin for a doctorate. Towards the end of his studies, he led a seminar on foreign studies as an employee of SS Major Franz Six who was director of the Hochschule. In 1941, Libertas Schulze-Boysen became an English language lecturer to teach translators the language. Schulze-Boysen who also lectured there and met three people at the institute that became important members of his group: student and interpreter Eva-Maria Buch; confirmed Nazi and Hitler Youth member Horst Heilmann and Luftwaffe officer Herbert Gollnow. Buch translated the resistance magazine Die Innere Front (English: "The Internal Front" or "The Home Front") into French. Little was known about Gollnow.

Heilmann met Schulze-Boysen when he wrote a paper called The Soviets and Versailles that was presented at a political seminar for the Hitler Youth being attended by Schulze-Boysen. Heilmann was introduced to Albrecht Haushofer through Schulze-Boysen; it was not the first meeting between Schulze-Boysen and Haushofer but was perhaps the first political one. According to new evidence that was presented in 2010, Schulze-Boysen and Haushofer met at least twice before, understood each other's motives, and allowed a compromise to be reached between them, which enabled Heilmann to turn away from Nazism. At Schulze-Boysen and Haushofer's first meeting, also attended by Rainer Hildebrandt whose apartment they were using, they discussed the possibility of cooperation between Germany and the Soviet Union. Haushofer was antipathetic towards the Soviet Union and believed that the only way to establish mutual agreement with Stalin's regime was to confront Soviet power with Europe's right to self-assertion. Schulze-Boysen pleaded for mutual collaboration between the two countries and believed that German communism would emerge as an independent political doctrine, while he anticipated a role for the Soviet Union in Europe. At a second meeting, with trust established between two sides, Haushofer told Schulze-Boysen that an assassination attempt against Hitler was being planned. These two meetings created a level of trust between the two men that reduced their risk of exposure when trying to turn the Wehrmacht officer. In August 1941, after a weekend sailing on the Großer Wannsee, on Schulze-Boysen's boat, the Duschika, Schulze-Boysen confided in Heilmann that he was working for the Russians as an agent. Heilmann supplied intelligence to Schulze-Boysen for almost a year.

=== Schulze-Boysen/Harnack Group ===
In 1941, Schulze-Boysen had access to other resistance groups and began to cooperate with them. The most important of these was a group run by Arvid Harnack who had known Schulze-Boysen since 1935, but was reintroduced to him sometime in late 1939 or early 1940 through Greta Kuckhoff. Kuckhoff knew Arvid and Mildred Harnack when the latter was studying in America at the end of the 1920s, and had brought the poet Adam Kuckhoff together with the couple. The Kuckhoffs had known the Schulz-Boysens since 1938, having met them at a dinner party hosted by film producer Herbert Engelsing and his wife Ingeborg Engelsing, a close friend of Libertas and started to engage them socially in late 1939 or early 1940 by bringing Mildred and Libertas together while on holiday in Saxony. Through the Engelsing's, the Schulze-Boysens were introduced to Maria Terwiel and her future fiance, the dentist Helmut Himpel.

In January 1941, Schulze-Boysen, promoted to lieutenant, was assigned to the attaché group of the 5th department of the Reich Aviation Ministry. His new place of work was in Wildpark in Potsdam, where the headquarters of the Luftwaffe was located. His job there was to process the incoming reports from the Luftwaffe attachés working in the individual embassies. At the same time, Harnack learned from him that the Reich Aviation Ministry was also involved in preparations for an invasion of the Soviet Union, and that the Luftwaffe was conducting reconnaissance flights over Soviet territory.

On 27 March 1941 in a meeting at the apartment of Arvid Harnack, Schulze-Boysen met the third secretary member of the Soviet embassy, Alexander Korotkov, who was known to Harnack as Alexander Erdberg. Korotkov was a Soviet intelligence agent who had been operating clandestinely in Europe for much of the 1930s as an employee of the foreign intelligence service of the Soviet People's Commissariat for State Security (NKGB). Korotkov assigned the code name Starshina, a Soviet military rank, to Schulze-Boysen as Harnack brought him into the operation. Without being aware of the exact activity of his counterpart at the time, Schulze-Boysen informed him in the conversation that the attack on the Soviet Union had been decided and would take place in the shortest possible time. On 2 April 1941, Schulze-Boysen informed Korotkov that the invasion plans were complete and provided Korotkov with an initial list of bombing targets of railways. On 17 April, Schulze-Boysen reported that the Germans were still indecisive. He stated that German generals in North Africa were hopeful of a victory over Great Britain, but the preparations for the invasion continued. In mid-April, in an attempt to increase the influx of intelligence, the Soviets ordered Korotkov to create a Berlin espionage operation. Harnack was asked to run the operation and the groups were given two radio transmitters. Schulze-Boysen selected Kurt Schumacher as their radio operator. In the same month, Korotkov began to pressure both groups to break contact with any communist friends and cease any kind of political activity. Schulze-Boysen had a number of friends with links to the Communist Party of Germany including Küchenmeister with whom he cut contact, but he continued to engage in politics. In May 1941, a suitcase-based radio transmitter was delivered to Harnack via Greta Kuckhoff. Eventually, Libertas was drawn into the espionage operation. As the month progressed, the reports provided to the Soviets became more important, as they in turn devoted more time to ensure the supply of information continued. On 6 June 1941, Schumacher was drafted into the German army and Schulze-Boysen found a replacement radio operator in Hans Coppi. Schulze-Boysen persuaded Coppi to establish a radio link to the Soviet Union for the resistance organisation. Both Harnack and Coppi were trained by a contact of Korotkov, in how to encode text and transmit it, but Coppi failed to send any messages due to inexperience and technical problems with the radio. Harnack managed to transmit messages but the operation was largely a failure. Around 13 June 1941, Schulze-Boysen prepared a report that gave the final details of the Soviet invasion including details of Hungarian airfields containing German planes.

When the Soviet invasion began on 22 June 1941, the Soviet embassy closed and due to the radio transmitters that had become defective, intelligence from the group failed to reach the Soviet Union. However, they still gathered information and collated it. The couple had read about the Franz Six murders in the Soviet Union and the group was aware of the capture of millions of Russian soldiers. Schulze-Boysens position in the Luftwaffe gave them a more detailed perspective than most Berliners and by September 1941, they realised that the fate of Russians and Jews had begun to converge. At the same time, the combined group started to collect military intelligence in a careful, systematic manner that could be used to overthrow the Nazis. Members of both groups were convinced that only by the military defeat of the Nazis could Germany be liberated and that by shortening the war, perhaps millions of people could be saved. Only in that way would Germany be able to be saved as an independent state at the centre of Europe.

On 18 October 1941, the Soviet agent Anatoly Gurevich was ordered by Leopold Trepper, the director of Soviet Intelligence in Europe, to drive to Berlin and find out why the group were no longer transmitting. Trepper received a message on 26 August 1941 with a set of instructions for the Schulze-Boysens, Harnacks and Kuckhoffs to re-establish communications. Although it took several weeks for Gurevich to reach Berlin, the visit was largely a failure and the groups remained independent. Gurevich received intelligence from Schulze-Boysen at a four-hour meeting they held at his apartment.

=== AGIS leaflets ===
In December 1941 or January 1942 (sources vary), the Schulze-Boysens met psychoanalyst John Rittmeister and his wife Eva. Rittmeister was happy to hear from the reports that informed him of the German military setback on the Eastern Front and convinced Schulze-Boysen that the reports should be shared with the German people, which would destroy the myth of German propaganda. However, Rittmeister did not share the activist politics of Schulze-Boysen, nor did he know about his espionage activities. The AGIS leaflet was created, named in reference to the Spartan King Agis IV, who fought against corruption. Rittmeister, Schulze-Boysen, Heinz Strelow, and Küchenmeister among others wrote them with titles like The becoming of the Nazi movement, Call for opposition, Freedom and violence and Appeal to All Callings and Organisations to resist the government.

On 15 February 1942, Schulze-Boysen led the group to write the six-page pamphlet called Die Sorge Um Deutschlands Zukunft geht durch das Volk! (English: "The Concern for Germany's Future Goes Through the People!"). Co-authored by Rittmeister, the master copy was arranged by the potter Cato Bontjes van Beek, a friend of Libertas, and the pamphlet was written up by Maria Terwiel on her typewriter. One copy survives today. The pamphlet posited the idea of active defeatism, which was a compromise between principled pacifism and practical political resistance. It stated the future for Germany lay in establishing a socialist state that would form alliances with the USSR and progressive forces in Europe. It also offered advice to the individual resistor: "do the opposite of what is asked of you". The group produced hundreds of pamphlets that were spread over Berlin, in phone boxes, and sent to selected addresses. Producing the leaflets required a small army of people and a complex approach to organisation to avoid being discovered.

=== The Soviet Paradise exhibition ===
Adhesive stickers that were posted on top of The Soviet Paradise posters

In May 1942, the Nazis publicised propaganda as an exhibit known as The Soviet Paradise. Massive photo panels depicting Russian Slavs as subhuman beasts who lived in squalid conditions and pictures of firing squads shooting young children and others who were hung were shown at the exhibit. Greta Kuckhoff was horrified by the exhibition. The group decided to respond and created a number of stickers to paste onto walls. On 17 May 1942, Schulze Boysen stood guard on each of the 19 members, travelling over five Berlin neighbourhoods at different times to paste the stickers over the original exhibition posters. The message read:

Permanent Exhibition
The Nazi Paradise
War, Hunger, Lies, Gestapo
How much longer?

The Harnacks were dismayed at Schulze-Boysen's actions and decided not to participate in the exploit, believing it to be reckless and unnecessarily dangerous.

== Discovery ==
The discovery of the illegal radio transmissions by Soviet agent Johann Wenzel by the radio counterintelligence organization Funkabwehr and his capture by the Gestapo on 29–30 June 1942 eventually revealed the Red Orchestra, and led to the arrest of the Schulze-Boysens. Wenzel decided to cooperate after he was tortured. His exposure of the radio codes enabled Referat 12, the cipher bureaux of the Funkabwehr, to decipher Red Orchestra message traffic. The unit had been tracking Red Orchestra radio transmissions since June 1941 and in December they raided a house in Brussels where Wenzel was transmitting that was found to contain a large number of coded messages. When Wilhelm Vauck, principal cryptographer of the Funkabwehr, the radio counterintelligence department of the Abwehr received the ciphers from Wenzel, he was able to decipher some of the older messages. Vauck found a message that was dated 10 October 1941. The message was addressed to KENT (Anatoly Gurevich) and had the header format: KL3 3 DE RTX 1010-1725 WDS GBD FROM DIREKTOR PERSONAL. When it was decrypted, it gave the location of three addresses in Berlin: The first address, 19 Altenburger Allee, Neu-Westend, third floor right and addressed to CORO was the Schulze-Boysens apartment. The two other addresses were the Kuckhoffs' and the Harnacks' apartments. When Vauck decrypted this message, it was forwarded to Reich Security Main Office IV 2A, where they identified the people living at the three addresses. The three couples were put under surveillance on 16 July 1942. There was a member of Schulze-Boysen's group working in Referat 12 in Vauck's team: Horst Heilmann, who was supplying Schulze-Boysen with intelligence. Heilmann tried to contact Schulze-Boysen but was unsuccessful and left a message with him to phone him back. Schulze-Boysen returned the call, but Vauck answered the phone and when he requested the name of the caller to take a message, and was met with Schulze-Boysen, the deception was revealed.

== Arrest and death ==
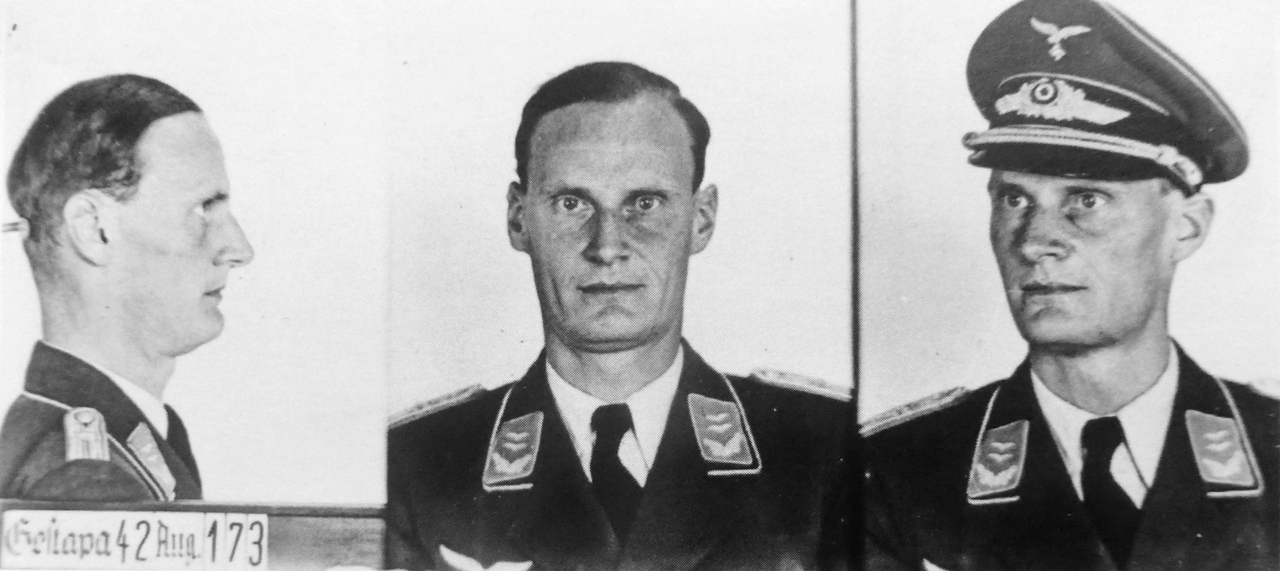
Schulze-Boysen's Gestapo identification photograph, 1942

On 31 August 1942, Schulze-Boysen was arrested in his office in the RLM, and his wife Libertas a few days later when she panicked and fled to a friend's house. After the war, the former Gestapo officer Johannes Strübing not only admitted to interrogating and torturing Schulze-Boysen, he parlayed his role in the destruction of the Red Orchestra into a successful career in West Germany's intelligence services.

On 15 December 1942, Harro and Libertas, along with many close friends including the Harnacks, the Schumachers, Hans Coppi, John Graudenz and Horst Heilmann, were tried in the Reichskriegsgericht, the highest military court in Nazi Germany. The group was prosecuted by Manfred Roeder and tried by five military judges consisting of a vice admiral, two generals and two professional judges. Evidence was presented to the court by Roeder along with an indictment that contained a juridical estimation of the case. There was no jury and prosecution witnesses were Gestapo agents. At the end of the trial, Roeder demanded the death sentence. On 19 December, the couple were sentenced to death for "preparation for high treason" and "war treason".

Harro Schulze-Boysen was executed by hanging on 22 December 1942 at 19:05 in Plötzensee Prison in Berlin. Libertas Schulze-Boysen was executed by guillotine 90 minutes after her husband.

Their bodies were released to Hermann Stieve, an anatomist at what is now Humboldt University, to be dissected for research. When Stieve was finished with them, their remains were taken to the Zehlendorf crematorium. Their final resting place is unknown.

== Honours ==
Honours granted to Schulze-Boysen

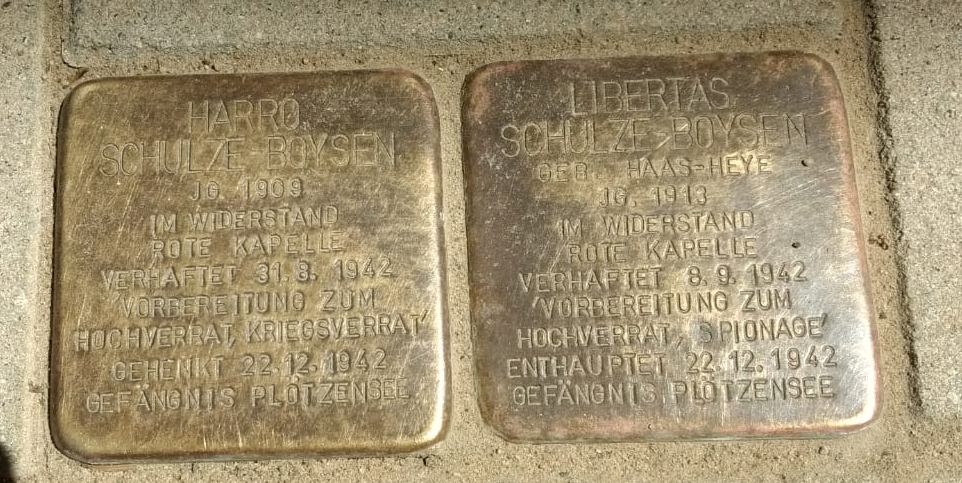
Stolpersteine for the Schulze-Boysens in the castle courtyard of Liebenberg Castle

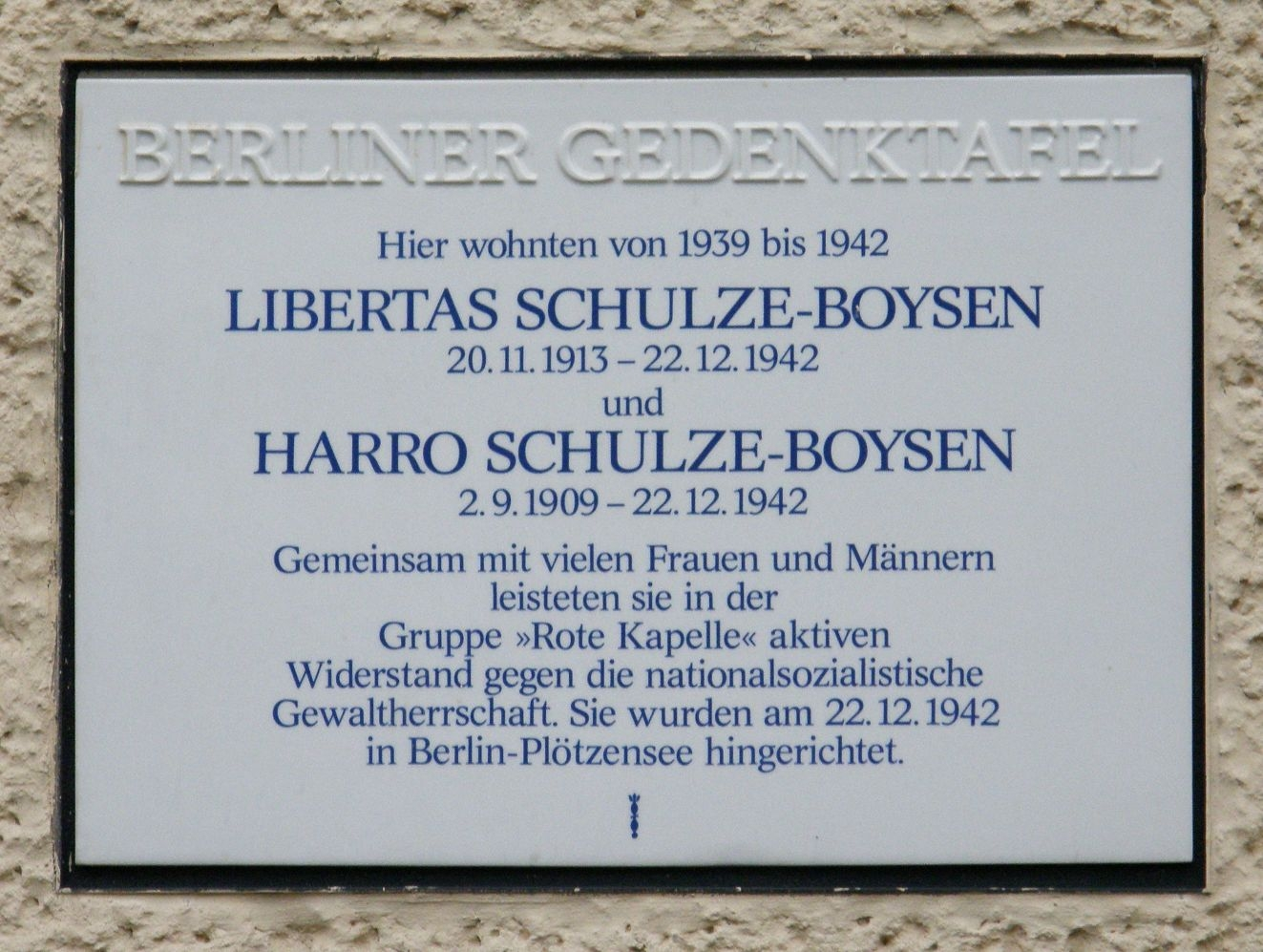
Berlin memorial plaque for the Schulze-Boysens at Haus Altenburger Allee 19 in Westend Berlin

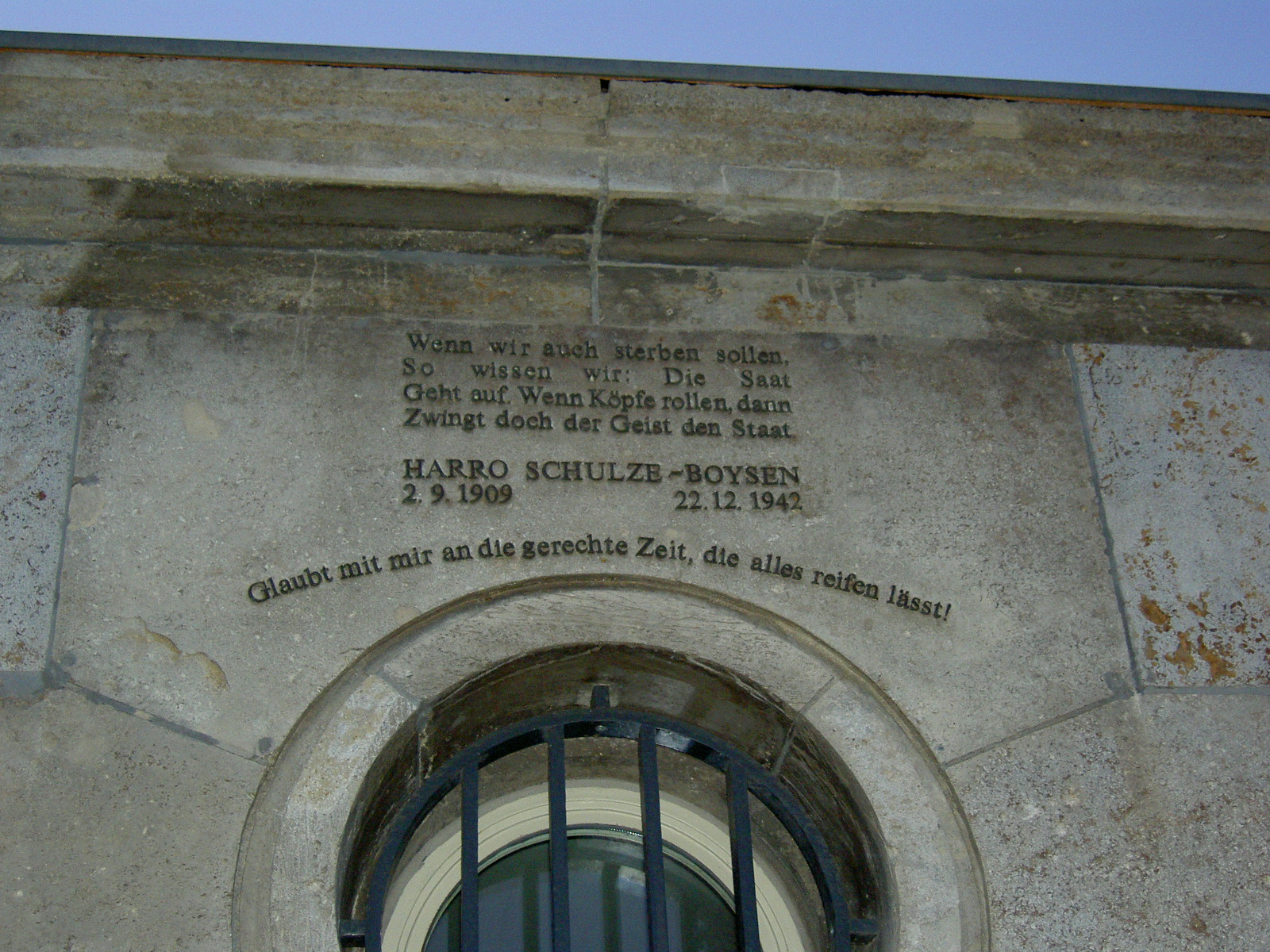
Quotation from Harro Schulze-Boysen at the German Federal Finance Ministry

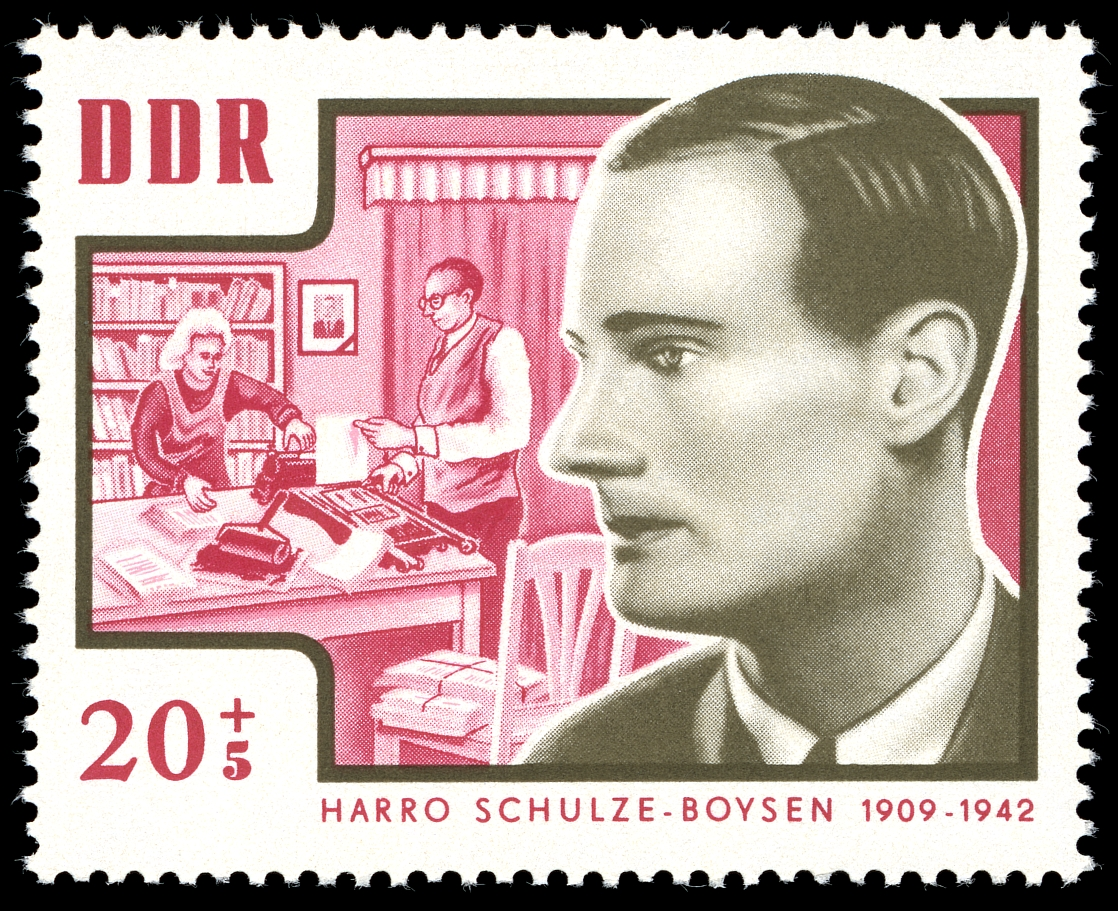
20+5 DDR Pfennig-Stamp with Harro Schulze-Boysen

- In 1964, the German Democratic Republic issued a special stamp series on the Communist Resistance, the 20+5-penny stamp that was dedicated to Schulze-Boysen.
- In 1967, The National People's Army News Regiment 14 was named after Schulze-Boysen.
- In 1969, Schulze-Boysen was posthumously awarded the Order of the Red Banner by the Soviet Union.
- In 1972 in the Berlin borough of Lichtenberg, a street is named after the Schulze-Boysens. The German Federal Finance Ministry has the following quote by Schulze-Boysen:

"Wenn wir auch sterben sollen,
So wissen wir: Die Saat
Geht auf. Wenn Köpfe rollen, dann
Zwingt doch der Geist den Staat."
"Glaubt mit mir an die gerechte Zeit, die alles reifen lässt!"
"Even if we should die,
We know this: The seed
Bears fruit. If heads roll, then
The spirit nevertheless forces the state."
"Believe with me in the just time that lets everything ripen."

There is also a Schulze-Boysen-Strasse in Duisburg, Leipzig, Rostock, Magdeburg and Ludwigsfelde.

- In 1983, the GDR issued a block of stamps in memory of the Schulze-Boysen/Harnack resistance group.
- In 1984, the sculpture Freedom Fighter by Fritz Cremer in Bremen was erected in memory of Mildred Harnack and Harro Schulze-Boysen at the Wilhelm Wagenfeld House in Bremen's Wallanlagen.
- In 1991, the picture Red Chapel Berlin (Tempera auf Nessel, 79 × 99 cm), painted by Carl Baumann in 1941, was the picture of the month for July in the Westphalian State Museum of Art and Cultural History in Münster.
- In 2009, the Harro Schulze-Boysen-Weg was inaugurated on November 26 on the occasion of his 100th birthday in Kiel.
- In 2017, two Stolperstein were laid at Liebenberg Castle in memory of Harro and Libertas Schulze-Boysen.
