= Elisabeth Schumacher =

German artist, photographer and resistance fighter (1904–1942)

- Born: 28 April 1904; Darmstadt, German Empire
- Died: 22 December 1942 (aged 38); Plötzensee Prison, Berlin, Nazi Germany
- Spouse: Kurt Schumacher

Elisabeth Schumacher (née Hohenemser; 28 April 1904 – 22 December 1942 in Plötzensee Prison, Berlin) was a German artist, photographer, and resistance fighter against the Nazi regime. She was a member of the Berlin-based anti-fascist resistance group that was later called the Red Orchestra (Rote Kapelle) by the Abwehr, during the Third Reich. Schumacher trained as an artist, but as her father was Jewish, she was classified as half-Jewish or Mischling, so worked as a graphic artist, before joining the resistance efforts.

== Life ==
Elisabeth Hohenemser was born into a well-off family, to a Jewish father and Christian mother in Darmstadt. Her father, engineer Fritz Hohenemser, was a soldier in World War I and came from a family of prominent bankers from the Frankfurt am Main area. Her mother came from Meiningen. In 1914, the family moved from Strasbourg (then part of Germany) to Frankfurt am Main. During the same year, Fritz Hohenemser died in action in the First World War, leading Elisabeth to move to Meiningen with her mother and siblings.

In 1921, she attended the School of Applied Arts (Kunstgewerbeschule) in Offenbach intermittently until 1925. She worked at a crafts studio until 1928, in order to study art in Berlin, which she did until 1933. After completing her studies, she stayed in Berlin and applied unsuccessfully (reportedly because she was half-Jewish) for a permanent spot at the Reich Office for Industrial Safety (Reichsstelle für Arbeitsschutz).

While living in Berlin, Schumacher met Kurt Schumacher. They had been close friends since 1930. He had been studying graphic arts with German artist Ernst Böhm as part of a three-year course. At the end of the course in 1933, Kurt Schumacher attained a position as a freelance graphic artist at the German Occupational Safety and Health Museum in Charlottenburg.

Kurt Schumacher was an anti-Nazi and sculptor. Together, Elisabeth and Kurt formed an organisation to fight against Hitler's regime. The beginning of World War II strengthened the need for this organization, and Elisabeth became more involved. The Schumachers spent much time helping those affected by Nazi Germany, but were ultimately arrested in September 1942. Elisabeth, along with her husband, was sentenced to death by the Nazi regime in December that year.

== Resistance activities ==
Elisabeth and her husband were inspired by Libertas and Harro Schulze-Boysen, and created an organization to fight against the Nazi regime. The start of World War II solidified this resolve. Later, the Schumachers joined Libertas and Harro Schulze-Boysen, along with Mildred and Arvid Harnack in their spy network, whom the Gestapo later dubbed the "Red Orchestra" (Rote Kapelle). The group was active giving out handbills and documenting the Nazi regime's crimes.

Schumacher wanted to protect Jewish relatives from deportation. Moreover, she believed there were possibilities of negotiating peace with the Soviet Union. Early in 1941, the Schumachers were involved in the attempt to warn the Soviet Union by Wireless about the forthcoming German invasion (Operation Barbarossa). In August 1942, they took in the Communist Albert Hößler (or Hoessler), who had lived in the Soviet Union since the 1930s. He had parachuted into Germany to support the resistance group's transmission of information to the Soviet Union.

== Arrest and death ==
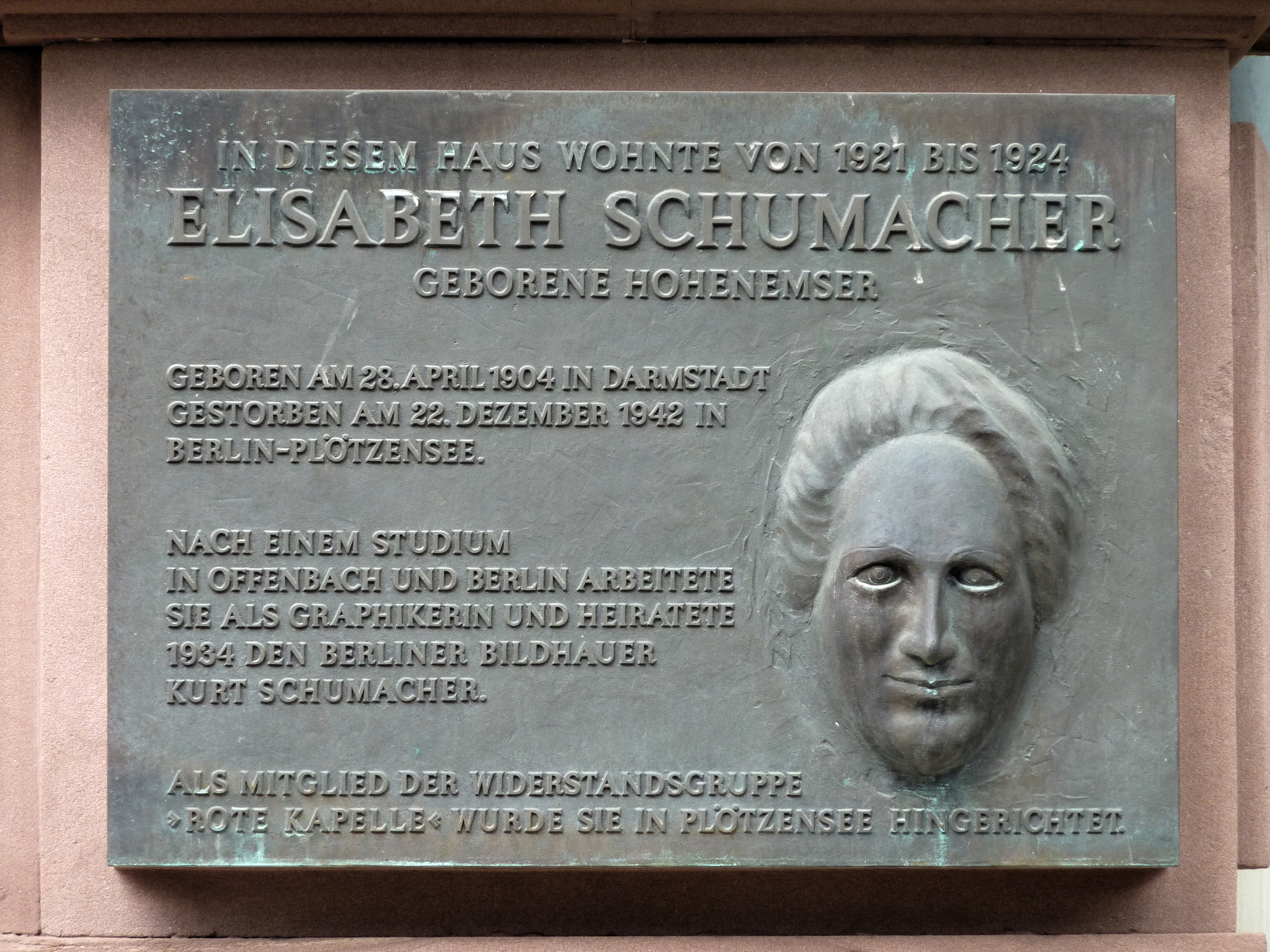
Memorial plaque for Elisabeth-Schumacher in Frankfurt, erected on 29 April 1994

In 1942, after a wireless message was decoded, many members of the resistance group were arrested. On 12 September 1942, Schumacher was arrested at her apartment in Tempelhof.

Like her husband, she was sentenced to death on 19 December 1942 at the Reichskriegsgericht ("Reich Military Tribunal") for "conspiracy to commit high treason", espionage, and other political crimes. Aged 38, she was beheaded on 22 December 1942 at Plötzensee Prison, forty-five minutes after her husband was hanged there.

== Honours ==
- Since the 1980s, there has been a stone memorial plaque to Elisabeth at the Schulstraße 4 residence in Meiningen, where she lived with her mother and siblings from 1915 to 1921. Schulstraße was renamed "Elisabeth-Schumacher-Straße" in 2019 in honour of Elisabeth.
- A bronze plaque was installed in Frankfurt at 46 Kettenhofweg. Schumacher lived there from 1921 to 1924, in 1994.
- On 25 September 2015, a Stolperstein (stumbling block) was laid in front of her former residence at 42 Werner-Voß-Damm in Tempelhof, Berlin.

== Bibliography ==
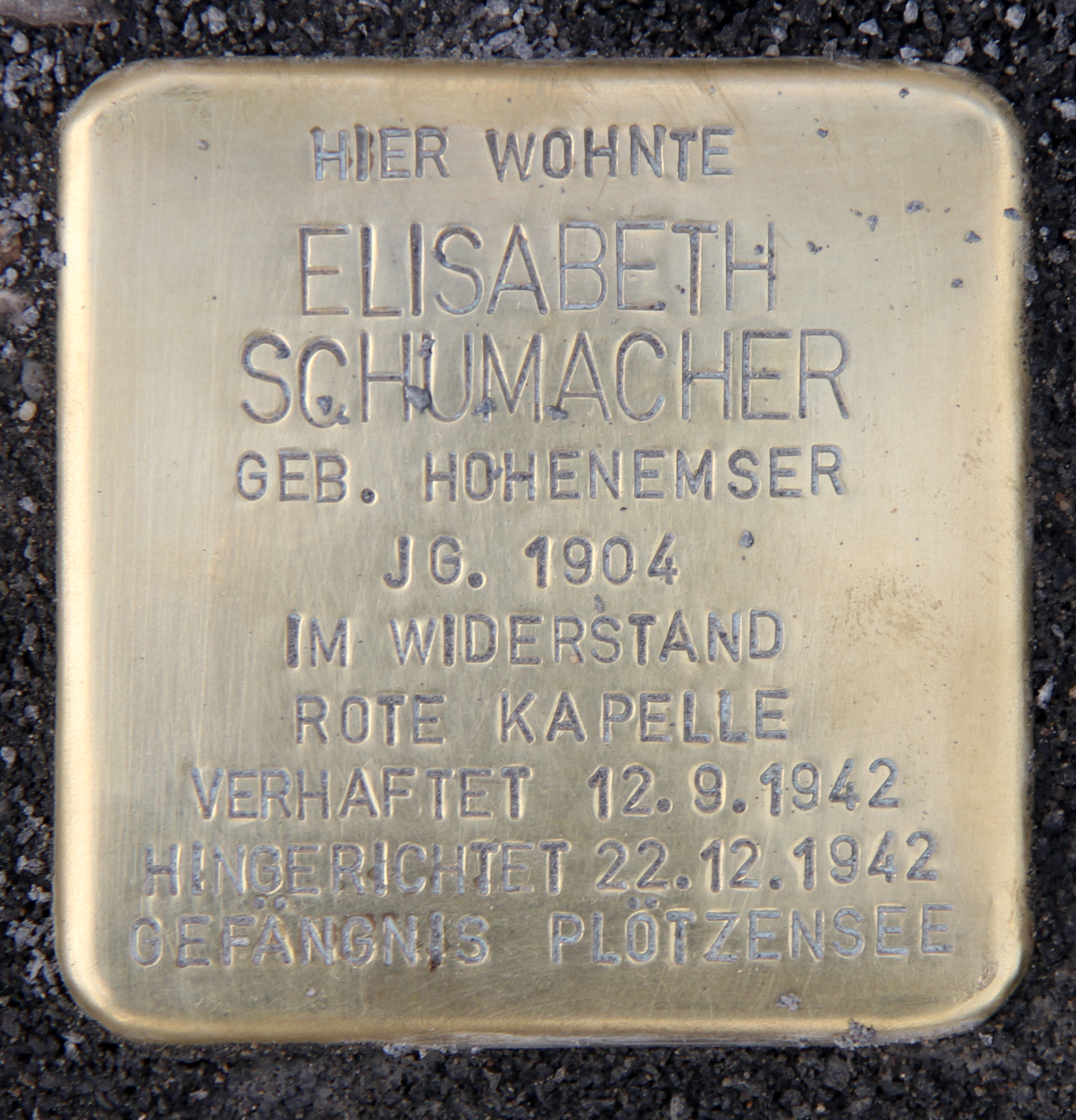
A Stolperstein placed to honour Elisabeth Schumacher

- Fischer-Defoy, Christine (1988). Kunst, Macht, Politik : die Nazifizierung der Kunst- und Musikhochschulen in Berlin (in German). Berlin: Elefanten Press. ISBN 3-88520-271-9. OCLC 923307412.
- Luise Kraushaar; Institut für Marxismus-Leninismus beim ZK der SED (1970). Deutsche Widerstandskämpfer 1933–1945 (in German). Berlin: Dietz-Verlag. OCLC 1149300905.
- Rosiejka, Gert (1986). Die Rote Kapelle 'Landesverrat' als antifaschist. Widerstand (in German) (1st ed.). Hamburg: Ergebnisse Verlag. ISBN 9783925622168. OCLC 497259004.
