= Kurt Schumacher (sculptor) =

German sculptor and resistance fighter (1905–1942)

- Kurt Schumacher after being drafted into the Wehrmacht
- Born: 6 May 1905; Stuttgart, German Empire
- Died: 22 December 1942 (aged 37); Plötzensee Prison, Berlin, Nazi Germany
- Education: Kunstgewerbemuseum Berlin
- Spouse: Elisabeth Schumacher

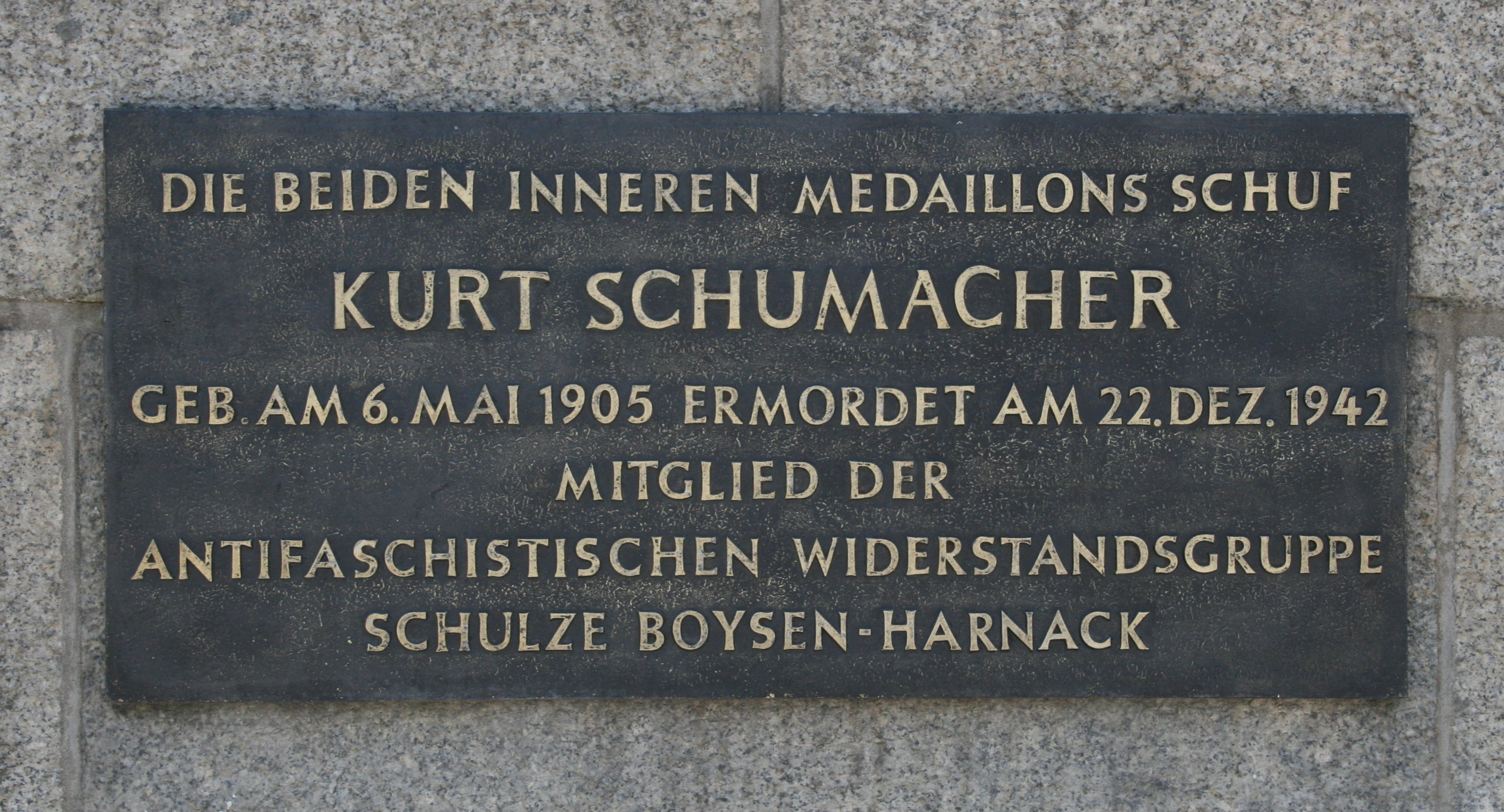
Memorial plaque for Kurt Schumacher at the Schleusenbrücke in Berlin

Kurt Schumacher (6 May 1905 – 22 December 1942) was a German sculptor and Communist member of the German Resistance fighter who was a member of the anti-fascist resistance group that was later called the Red Orchestra by the Gestapo. He was married to the painter and graphic designer, Elisabeth Schumacher who was also an anti-fascist.

== Biography ==
Schumacher was born in Stuttgart. As a 14-year-old, he moved to Berlin to begin an apprenticeship with a wood carver. He first worked with Berlin wood carver Alfred Böttcher. Subsequently, he worked and studied with Ludwig Gies, first at the School of the Museum of Decorative Arts (Unterrichtsanstalt des Kunstgewerbemuseums), then in 1935, as a master student at the Vereinigten Staatsschulen für Freie und Angewandte Kunst (VSS), the State School of Free and Applied Arts in Berlin.

Beginning in 1932, he worked at the journal, Der Gegner ("The Adversary"), where he met Harro Schulze-Boysen. Schulze-Boysen and his wife, Libertas introduced him to Hans Coppi, Heinrich Scheel and Eugen Neutert. Political discussions strengthened their growing resistance to Nazism.

The atelier at the VSS became a "conspiracy bulletin board," where people from the Resistance were able to associate under the guise of working as models. In 1934, Schumacher married painter and graphic artist, Elisabeth Hohenemser.

In 1939, Schumacher helped an escapee from Aschendorf-Moor Prison, Rudolf Bergtel, flee to Switzerland. In 1941, he was drafted to serve in the Wehrmacht, where, risking great danger, he published a leaflet called "Open Letter to the Eastern Front," in 1942. He also gave shelter to a parachute agent, Albert Hößler, who arrived from Moscow in early August 1942.

In protest of the National Socialist attack on Gies, Schumacher resigned his privileged position as master student. (The designation meant he had his "own" atelier – albeit shared – with Fritz Cremer.)

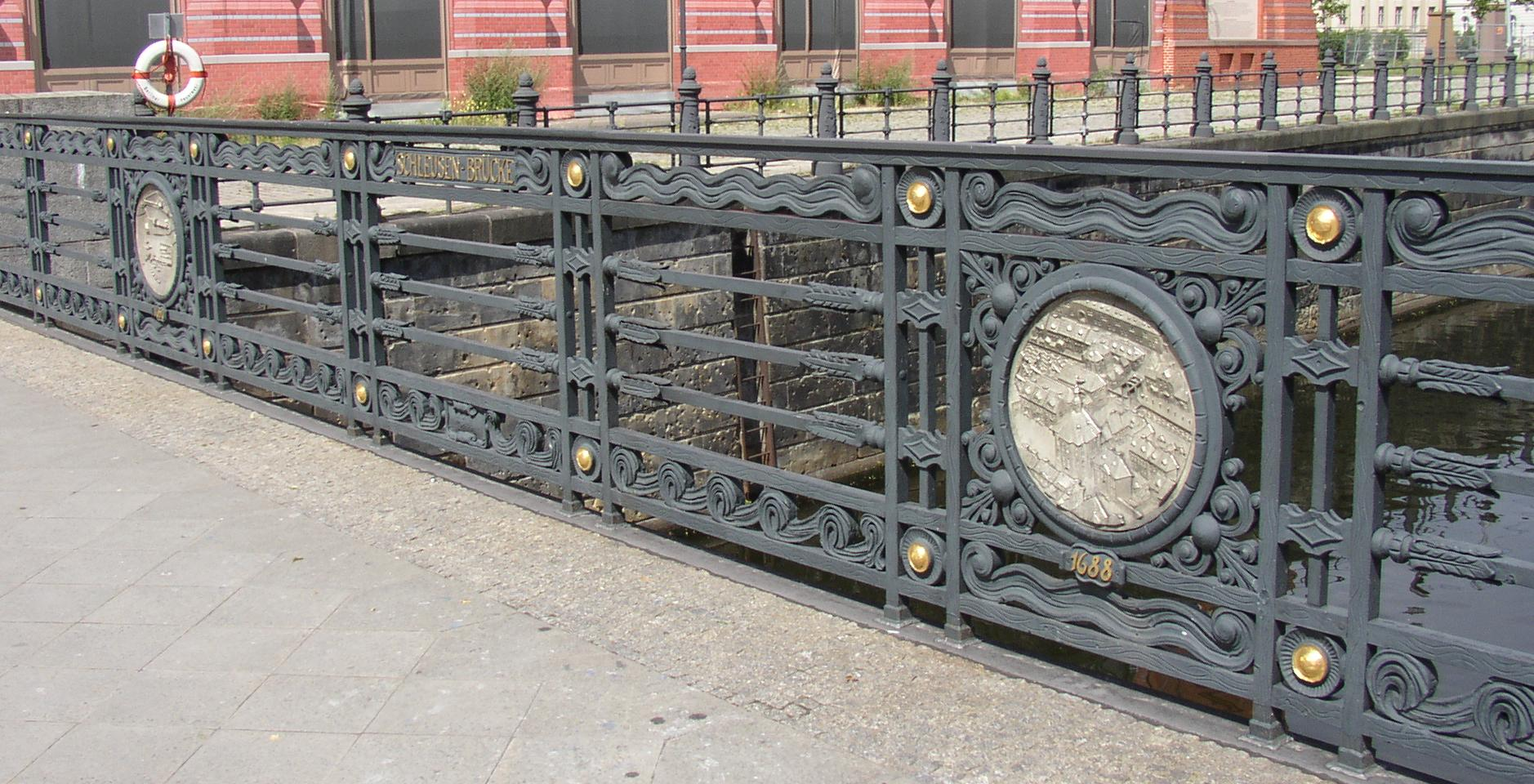
Schleusenbrücke with Schumacher's medallions

During Schumacher's arrest on 12 September 1942, the Gestapo destroyed his studio in Berlin, including a large amount of his artwork. Surviving works by Schumacher include two medallions he designed on the Schleusenbrücke (bridge) in Berlin, a basalt head and a printing block for the illustration, "Dance of the Dead" (Totentanz) at the German Historical Museum (Deutsche Historische Museum).

There is a 1941 painting by Carl Baumann called "Rote Kapelle Berlin" at the Academy of the Arts (Akademie der Künste), where Schumacher's Resistance group often met.

On 19 December 1942 Schumacher was sentenced to death by the Reichskriegsgericht. Three days later, on 22 December 1942, he was hanged at Plötzensee Prison, just forty-five minutes before his wife was executed.

== Awards ==
Schumacher received an award for a figurative sculpture in 1932 from the Akademie der Künste.

== Sources ==
- Christine Fischer-Defoy: Kunst Macht Politik. Die Nazifizierung der Kunst- und Musikhochschulen in Berlin. Elefanten Press, Berlin (1988) (in German)
- Gert Rosiejka: Die Rote Kapelle. „Landesverrat“ als antifaschistischer Widerstand. With an introduction by Heinrich Scheel. Hamburg (1986) ISBN 3-925622-16-0 (in German)
- Luise Kraushaar, Deutsche Widerstandskämpfer 1933 bis 1945. Berlin (1970) Vol. 2, p. 230 (in German)
