= Szeliga (surname) =

Szeliga is a Polish-language surname. It has archaic feminine forms: Szeligowa for married women and Szeliżanka for unmarried. It is a family name of Polish nobility bearing the Szeliga coat of arms.

The South Slavic version of the surname is Šeliga and the Ukrainian form is Sheliha. The surname may also appear as Chéliga (French-style), Sheliga, Scheliga, Scheliha, and Šeliha.

Notable people with this surname include:

- Bartosz Szeliga (born 1993), Polish footballer
- Chad Szeliga (born 1976), American musician
- Jan Szeliga (died 1636), Polish-Ukrainian book printer
- Kathy Szeliga (born 1961), American politician
- Maria Szeliga (born 1952), Polish archer
- Marya Chéliga-Loevy or Maria Szeliga (1854–1927), Polish writer
- Michał Szeliga (born 1995), Polish footballer
- Renata von Scheliha (1901–1967), German philologist
- Rudolf von Scheliha (1897–1942), German resistance fighter
- Sławomir Szeliga (born 1982), Polish footballer

== See also ==
- Seliga
