= Seliga =

Seliga is a surname. It is either Šeliga without diacritics, or a variant of Szeliga. Notable people with this surname include:

- Andrew Seliga (born 1989), American Army Captain and Cavalry leader
- Aleksander Šeliga (born 1980), Slovenian footballer
- Dariusz Seliga (born 1969), Polish politician
- Joe Seliga (1911–2005), American canoe builder
- Juraj Šeliga (born 1990), Slovak politician

== See also ==
- Siliga
- Suliga
- Cigaritis seliga
