= Manfred Roeder (judge) =

German judge (1900–1971)

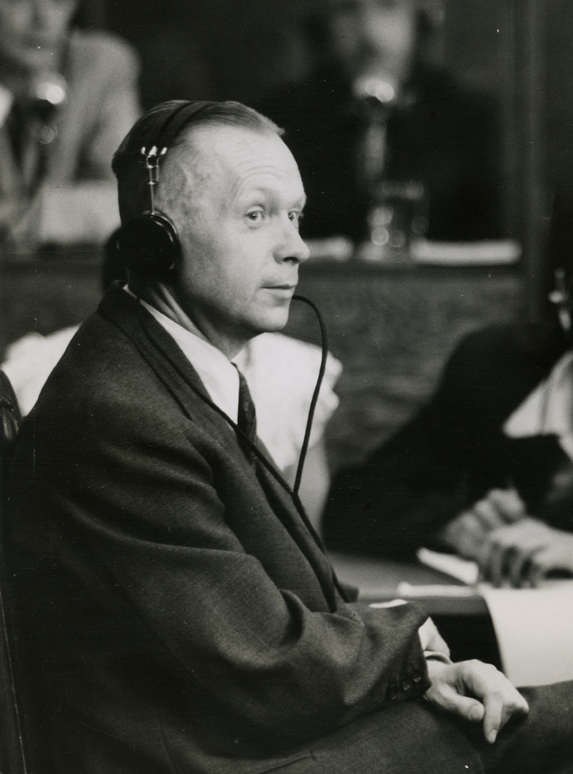
Prosecution witness Manfred Roeder sits on the witness stand at the Nuremberg Trials (1947).

Manfred Roeder (August 20, 1900 – October 18, 1971) was a military judge in Nazi Germany and after the war became a confirmed Nazi apologist. Holding the rank of Oberstkriegsgerichtsrat (Senior Military Court Councillor), he served as the investigating officer and prosecutor, bearing partial responsibility for at least 45 death sentences handed down by the Reich Court Martial in the trials of members of the Red Orchestra ("Rote Kapelle") resistance movement. Roeder was also the investigator and prosecutor in the so-called “deposit box funds” proceedings against Dietrich Bonhoeffer, Hans von Dohnanyi, Wilhelm Schmidhuber and others. After Germany's defeat in World War II, there were attempts by survivors, family and the U.S. Army to investigate the prosecutions of Red Orchestra members and others, but Roeder was never convicted of any malfeasance or crime since the Allies wanted information from him about the Russians to aid them in the nascent Cold War.

After the war, Roeder was politically active in the far-right Socialist Reich Party, before it was banned. He began giving lectures at meetings of the Deutsche Reichspartei and wrote a book, further defaming the Red Orchestra as well as other people he had prosecuted. This led to work as an expert witness in espionage with the Federal Court of Justice. In 1961, he sold his Neetze estate and retired to Glashütten.

== Life ==
Roeder was the son of a Landgericht director from Kiel. After passing his notabitur examination in 1917, he volunteered for military service and became an officer cadet working as an artillery observer in a 3rd Rhine Field Artillery Regiment No. 83. In December 1918, he was demobbed with the rank of rank of lieutenant. He was later awarded an Iron Cross (2nd Class) for having been poisoned by gas in July 1918. In 1919, Roeder then joined the Guards Cavalry Rifle Division where he fought in street battles in Berlin. He then joined the Freikorps, a volunteer militia and saw action in Baltic region when he was posted to the Volunteer Russian Western Army, a Belarusian anti-communist unit.

From 1918 to 1921, he studied law at the Humboldt University of Berlin, University of Würzburg, and University of Göttingen. He continued his studies, resulting in being awarded a doctorate in Labour law in Würzburg in 23 February 1922 with the title "Arbeit über den „öffentlichrechtlichen Arbeiterschutz der Seeleute" (Study on the "public-law protection of seafarers").

Roeder then returned to Berlin where he worked at the Charlottenburg Water and Industrial Works Ltd until 1924. In December 1922, he married a noblewomen Hedwig-Luise von Estorff, which elevated his social rank. Between 1924 and 1928, Roeder managed his wife's estate known as "Estorff " that was located near Neetze in Lüneburg, that had been in her family since the 19th century. The couple had 4 children, three daughters, the first in 1924, second in 1925 and the third in 1929. The couple then had a late child, a son, who was born in 1937.

== Civil career ==
From 1928 to 1930, Roeder worked as the legal counsellor in the Lower Elbe purchasing cooperative in Hamburg and used his spare time to continue his studies in Göttingen and Hamburg. During this period, he studied a number of subjects but finally decided to specialise in law. While working for the cooperative, he became a member of both Der Stahlhelm, Bund der Frontsoldaten, a nationalistic fascist ex-servicemen association and the right-wing nationalistic conservative German National People's Party.

On 1 May 1931, Roeder formalised his law education by passing the state examination Referenda under the Prussian training regulations of 1923 to become a trainee lawyer. He passed the exam with the mediocre grade of "fully sufficient" (*voll ausreichend*). In May 1933, Roeder joined the League of National Socialist German Jurists which was followed by membership in November 1933, the Sturmabteilung. He then began working as a legal trainee in Lüneburg until the end April 1934, then moved Hanover, and Berlin for further training. While in Berlin on 17 August 1934, Roeder passed the Assessor licencing examination, achieving the grade “sufficient” (ausreichend) that would enable him entry into the higher civil service. After briefly working as a reserve officer in Altes Lager, he began working as a judge at the Charlottenburg Amtsgericht (District court) on 1 October 1934.

== Luftwaffe career ==
In 1933, Roeder initially applied to become a military judge, to avoid joining the Nazi Party, but was rejected. In April 1935, Roeder began working as a military judge in the Luftwaffe in April 1935 working on probation at the Artillery Commander's Court (Gericht des Artillerieführers) in Königsberg. On 1 November 1935, Roeder accepted a position as supervising judge advocate at the Court of Air District Command I (Gericht des Luftkreiskommandos) working as a supervising military judge where he administered court proceedings (Dienstaufsichtsrichter in the position of Kriegsgerichtsrat). He undertook the same work at both Air District VII in Braunschweig in April 1937 and at Air District Command III Berlin from December 1938. Roeder had a reputation for being "one of the harshest and most regime-loyal military judges." In one of Roeders performance reports, described by Hiska Bergander:

He stands on the foundation of the National Socialist conception of the state. He has therefore also understood how to work in close coordination with the party offices.

According to Bergander in her doctoral thesis, this "goes far beyond standardized formulas... and expresses Roeder's political affinity with National Socialism". In January 1939, Roeder was promoted to Senior Judge Advocate general (Oberkriegsgerichtsrat) that was followed by a further promotion in August 1941 to Chief Judge Advocate General (Oberstkriegsgerichtsrat). Between March 1941 and August 1941, he was seconded to Luftwaffe headquarters (Luftwaffenbefehlshaber Mitte) in the Wannsee. On 1 December 1944, Roeder was promoted to General Judge of the Luftwaffe (Generalrichter der Luftwaffe). He maintained close ties to Hermann Göring, who placed great trust in him. When the popular Luftwaffe General Ernst Udet committed suicide—raising the risk that the act might be interpreted as political criticism—Göring tasked Roeder with the investigation. Roeder delivered the desired outcome. Roeder also maintained close relations with Gestapo chief Heinrich Müller. From then on, Goering used Roeder for sensitive political cases including investigations into the Red Orchestra resistance fighters case, the investigation into the suicide of Luftwaffe Chief of General Staff Hans Jeschonnek and the investigations into resistance efforts in the Abwehr.

=== Rote Kapelle case ===
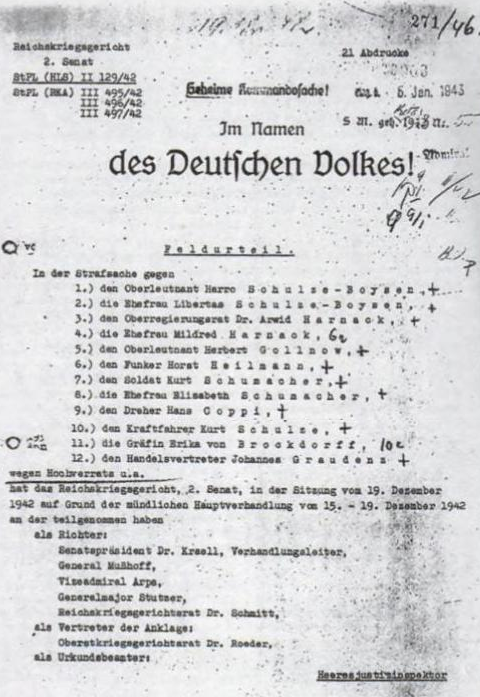
Judgment of the Reich Court Martial against Schulze-Boysen et al.

In late August 1942, the resistance group centred around Harro Schulze-Boysen and Arvid Harnack was exposed. It resulted in 119 individuals being arrested; of these, 79 were indicted before the Reich Court Martial. Roeder was assigned by Hermann Göring to the Reich Court Martial for the proceedings, where he served as the chief investigating officer and prosecutor, with his official title being Chief War Prosecutor of the Reich. Adolf Hitler, who considered the court's previous verdicts insufficiently harsh, had agreed to the trials only on this condition. Although the accused formed a loose network of individuals with widely varying political backgrounds and convictions, the Abwehr—and later Roeder, acting as prosecutor—falsely characterised them as a unified communist espionage organisation controlled by the Soviet Union, labelling them with the name Red Orchestra ("Rote Kapelle"), a term originally coined for investigative purpose. On the 19 October 1942, Roeder liaised with Luftwaffe Field Marshall Erhard Milch about the case and began formal proceedings on 14 December 1942 against the group that resulted in 45 death sentences. Roeder led many of these investigations.

Numerous surviving defendants later consistently described Roeder’s conduct as both callous and blatantly inhumane. One example of this behaviour occurred when Meta Strelow, mother to Heinz Strelow, executed on 13 May 1943, contacted Roeder on 24 May: "I have received your ghastly notification that my only child is no longer alive and that the sentence has indeed been carried out. So that I may lovingly provide a grave for my son, I ask to be informed when and where I can receive my child’s body". Roeder forwarded a letter to Strelow on 26 May 1943 stating: "Your son’s body cannot be released at this stage. In any case, under current regulations, burial outside Berlin would not have been permitted. Furthermore, I would point out that not even German soldiers who have fallen on the field of honour at the front can be granted a final resting place in their homeland". For co-defendant Adolf Grimme, former Prussian Minister of Science, Art and People's Education, Roeder was "...one of the worst criminals of the shameful justice system of those years".. Axel von Harnack, who sought to intercede on behalf of his cousin Arvid, recounted his encounter with Roeder: "Never again have I received such a distinct impression of brutality from a man. He was someone who radiated an atmosphere of fear.".

During the proceedings, Roeder further disparaged the defendants by accusing them of sexually "immoral and decadent behaviour". In his sentencing demands, he called for the death penalty "on an assembly-line basis", even for offences such as holding money for one of the other defendants. Of the 79 defendants, one had been beaten to death during interrogation, and another had hanged himself. Of the 77 verdicts handed down, 45 were death sentences—including that of Cato Bontjes van Beek, who was executed. Twelve defendants were sentenced to penal servitude, and 17 to prison terms. After the trial concluded, Roeder went to Brussels and Paris, where, presiding over courts-martial, he "handed over to the executioner" numerous other foreign defendants linked to the "Red Orchestra". Roeder later boasted to a fellow judge that he had "delivered about 90 heads to the Führer" and had dissuaded Hitler from showing "inappropriate leniency toward women".

Roeder personally attended 11 executions in Plötzensee Prison. When the new gallows were installed for the Red Orchestra executions he commented "Death was instantaneous and—insofar as the word 'humanity' can be used in this context—more humane than the guillotine". In total he presided over 24 death sentences. As the records of that period are fragmentary, it enabled Roeder to minimise his responsibility for the trial verdicts.

=== Deposit funds case ===
The proceedings in this case were triggered by an attempt by Heinrich Himmler and the Reich Security Main Office to weaken and seize control of the Abwehr—the Wehrmacht’s intelligence service led by Wilhelm Canaris. The immediate cause was the so-called "Depositenkasse Case" (*Depositum* referring to a type of security deposit)—an investigation into Abwehr officer Wilhelm Schmidhuber for violating foreign currency regulations, a case that also implicated Dietrich Bonhoeffer and Hans von Dohnanyi.

After Roeder—at the time the presiding supervisory judge at the Luftwaffe field court for special assignments (zur besonderen Verwendung) in Berlin—was appointed investigating officer for the case in April 1943, Bonhoeffer, Dohnanyi, and the future CSU politician Josef Müller were also arrested on charges of high treason and treason against the state. Roeder attempted to frame the case as a major conspiracy, coining the term Schwarze Kapelle ("Black Orchestra") to describe it. Despite resorting to threats and abuse, he failed to substantiate the charges, largely due to the adroit conduct of the two accused men, Bonhoeffer and Dohnanyi. Abwehr General Hans Oster, who was also under suspicion, wrote the following about Roeder after his first interrogation by him: "Young, arrogant, pathologically ambitious, driven by unbridled impulses... an investigator of the modern breed... He is utterly unscrupulous in his choice of means and methods. One could describe him as a sadist".

Due to the lack of substantive investigative results and numerous complaints lodged by the accused and their lawyers, Roeder was removed from the case after the indictment had been drafted. Neither a main trial nor a conviction of Bonhoeffer and Dohnanyi ever took place. Despite the failed "deposit office" proceedings, Roeder's professional ascent continued. In 1944, he became chief judge of Air Fleet 4—initially with the rank of "Oberstrichter" (seniormost judge)—serving first in Lemberg and later in the Balkans. During the final months of the war, he was ultimately appointed General Judge for the Luftwaffe on 1 December 1944.

== After World War II ==
=== War crimes accusations ===
On 9 May 1945, Roeder was captured by US troops in Tyrol, where he had fled. Over the next two years, he was imprisoned in various prisoner-of-war camps in Southern Germany. In the autumn of 1946, Roeder was transferred to the International Military Tribunal in Nuremberg, as a prosecution witness. At the end of the war, Roeder was accused by the former defendants of the Rote Kapelle trials, relatives and other parties of crimes against humanity, coercion of testimony and assault in office. On 15 September 1945, former Prussian Culture Minister Adolf Grimme made a complaint against Roeder to the British military government for "bodily injury committed in an official capacity" (Körperverletzung im Amt) and for "extorting a statement" (Aussageerpressung. A further joint complaint was made by Grimme, Günther Weisenborn and Greta Kuckhoff to the International Military Court in Nuremberg. By January 1947, the Nuremberg prosecutors were convinced that Roeder should be charged with war crimes. In May 1947, Roeder was re-classed to "Defendant A", a prisoner to be tried. He was then interrogated by Robert Kempner and Fred Rodell but no trial was initiated.

=== Informant for US intelligence ===
On 4-5 June 1947 he testified in Case III, the trial against the principal German jurists from the Ministry of Justice, commonly called the "Justice Case". Roeder remained with the Tribunal until June 1947, when he was subsequently interred, kept for further questioning.

On 23 December 1947, Roeder had become an informant for the CIC, placing him out reach of a prosecution brought by Adolf Grimme and Greta Kuckoff. On 31 December 1947, the CIC wrote a report in which Roeder had the code name "Othello" in a summary of his testimony. Roeder had testified that the "Red Orchestra continued to be alive and active" and that "despite certain interests and attempts to portray it as a resistance organisation, it was in fact a spy network controlled by the Soviets". In his first report, written in early 1947, Roeder testified that the Red Orchestra was still active and controlled by the Soviets. The 37-page report written for the Americans, identified all members of the Red Orchestra and their functions. Roeder stated he could not avert the death sentences, because Hitler's "Peoples Pest Ordinance" left him no choice at the time. The "civil justice system" had carried out the sentences and carried out a "reconstruction" of the execution site. Hanging was more humane than the fall-by-case. Hitler alone was responsible for rejecting the requests for clemency. He had demanded a summary condemnation of all the imprisoned members against which the Reichskriegsgericht had successfully passed on a case-by-case examination. On 12 January 1948, US authorities requested that the CIC hold Roeder indefinitely. This resulted in Roeder releasing another report on 19 January 1948, at 90 pages, with photographs of Red Orchestra members, under the name "Bolshevik High and Treasonous Organisation in the Reich and Western Europe" describing it as a spy network spread across Europe that the Soviet Union had built up since the 1930s to conquer the continent. The report used the type of language and mentality, characteristic of Roeder and other Nazi judges. As Roeder pointed out that the trial records of the prosecutions had been burned, he felt capable of distorting the historical truth. As the CIC had told Roeder that his reports would only be accepted if he wasn't convicted, the reports became the method by which he defended himself and this led to him distorting many historical facts and defaming the victims of the Nazi dictatorship.

By 1948, although the evidence obtained from the CIC was dubious, the Central Intelligence Agency were convinced that Red Three in Switzerland was still active. Roeder's description of the group indicated how little the Nazi state knew about the Swiss group. As a result, the Allied services took on the Gestapo myth from Roeder and other informants. However, by 13 May 1948, a CIA memo was in circulation that detailed how Roeder had delivered no concrete evidence. In the summer of 1948, the American military government handed over the investigation against Roeder to the German authorities. Because Roeder was in US custody in Nuremberg at the time, his case was transferred to the German prosecution in Nuremberg, who has issued an arrest warrant against him on 25 October 1948 on the basis of the complaint filed by Grosse, Kuckhoff and Weisenborn.

== Postwar investigations and legal battle ==
=== Nuremberg trial ===
Roeder was placed into pre-trial detention at the Nuremberg-Fürth Regional Court. He was accused of using coercive measures in 1942 and 1942 to extract confessions of guilt and of causing serious bodily harm to several defendants in the complaint including Harro Schulze-Boysen, Kuckhoff and John Graudenz, all of whom were subject to intensified interrogation. In his pretrial statement Roeder stated "[that] he felt completely innocent... As a German judge I have done my duty". The exculpatory witness was none other than the former presiding judge of the trial against the Red Orchestra, Alexander Kraell. Many witnesses for the prosecution decided not to testify at the trial as they didn't want to be associated with the Red Orchestra, who were still seen as traitors.. On 13 January 1949, the case prosecutor, Erhard Heinke stated that any sentence likely received by Roeder, would already have been served due to the length of time he had been in internment. An interim report released by Nuremberg Public Prosecutor General Hans Meuschel, the senior prosecutor for Nuremberg, stated that a significant aspect of the charges against Roeder, that he has instigated intensified interrogations against Red Orchestra prisoners, couldn't be upheld. However, Meuschel has no doubt that Roeder acted inhumanely toward his victims. On 7 January 1949, Roeder was released and returned to his Neetze estate, leaving the Nuremberg jurisdiction.

=== Lüneburg trial ===
Roeder was initially planning to apply for a judgeship in Lower Saxony, but the case against him was still open. As his estate fell under Lüneburg jurisdiction, which was in the British occupation zone, he could be investigated under the Control Council Act No. 10 law, the German law that recognised crimes against humanity. Roeder was fortunate as his case was taken under purview of Lüneburg Public Prosecutor General Wilhelm Kumm, who has been the public prosecutor during the Nazi era and an acquaintance of Roeder. Kumm assigned the case to Lüneburg prosecutor Hans-Jürgen Finck, who was also an old acquaintance. In a letter that Finck wrote to Kumm in June 1950 describes how both sympathised with Roeder. Prior to the trial, Roeder blackmailed Finck and Kumm, threatening them with exposure of some prior crime during the Nazi era, if they didn't close the case, as he had the documents to prove it. So the whole approach by Finck was to minimise the accusations and reject the motions. Finck eventually produced 7 volumes totalling 2000 pages based on evidentiary material. In 1951, Finck produced a final 1732 page report with over half specific to the Red Orchestra resistance.

==== Fincks report ====
Finck wrote the report as though the Nazis were still in power, with the belief that Hitler lost the war due to anti-Nazi opposition. In the report he devised new arguments against those whom he saw as opponent of the Nazis, but who he saw as has been insufficiently sentenced. He deeply regretted the fact that the Gestapo failed to discover the connections between the Red Orchestra and the White Rose group. He was surprised about the leniency of the sentence given to Mildred Harnack, believing she knew about her husbands resistance activities. He expressed astonishment that Grimme hadn't been executed along with those with leftist views. In many judgements, he took a more extreme position than Hitler. He reserved his most vile judgement for the protestant pastor Dietrich Bonhoeffer, considered him along with Canaris and Karl Sack, Judge Advocate General of the Army, as the most "abhorrent traitors".

In examining Roeders charges, specifically arranging torture to extract confessions, which was considered a war crime — an accusation made by the widow of von Dohnanyi, Christine von Dohnanyi — Finck came to the conclusion that Dohnanyi had a normal interrogation even under threat of torture, He decided that Christine's testimony was unreliable, as she was guilty of treason, i.e. she knew she was guilty. He also deemed Kuckhoff's evidence unreliable as she was a part of a communist propaganda campaign against Germany. Prison chaplain Harald Poelchau was the most credible witness. He was present in both Plötzensee Prison and Tegel Prison during the same period as Roeder and saw many of the abuses and accused Roeder of the most brutal methods. Finck saw him as a traitor to the nation and discounted his testimony. Many others witness testimonies were discounted as Finck believed they lacked objectivity due to their hatred of Germany. Conversely, Finck saw Alexander Kraell, the presiding judge of the Reichsgericht as the most fair and credible witness and it was Kraell who assured Finck that the trial against the Red Orchestra resistance folk was conducted with the utmost fairness and that there was no torture involved. This was the position taken by former Gestapo officers who gave testimony, witnesses that Finck also found credible. He saw the Gestapo as a legitimate and legal part of the Nazi state and enhanced interrogation i.e. torture, a normal tool of investigation.

The most egregious aspect of the case was that Roeder was called as an expert witness, rather than an accused individual in his own case. Indeed, Roeder helped draft the final report in his own case.

The final report stated "the accused's statements were fully corroborated by information received from Gestapo officers, who completely refuted the accusations leveled against Roeder" and "that the testimonies of Roeder and the Gestapo officers alike are completely free of political prejudice and devoid of bias". Finck saw Roeder as victim and saw Karl Sack in particular, as Roeders nemesis. Finck believed that colleagues of Sack, a member of the 20 July plot to assassinate Hitler, had started a smear campaign against Roeder that had lead to the prosecution.

==== Case dismissal ====
On 12 May 1951, the case being pursued in the German legal system was similarly halted by the state's attorney in Lüneburg for lack of reasonable suspicion. The final report came to the conclusion that the trials before the Reich court martial were not objectionable and the accused were rightly sentenced to death, since in every age treason has been treated as the "most ignominious crime" and the participants in the July 20, 1944 plot to assassinate Hitler were driven in broad measure by treason and espionage. The report was kept secret until it was finally released in 1986.

During the early 1950s, Roeder unabashedly continued his public attacks and defamation of the surviving members of the 'Rote Kapelle'. He cited the cost of their 'treason' in terms of German military losses while glossing over the millions of deaths caused by the Nazi regime he himself was still defending. However the case had other manifest effects. Victims families faced discrimination as they were seen as traitors and were unable to receive pensions. This was most visible in the widow of Rudolf von Scheliha, Marie Louise von Scheliha who was left destitute and campaigned for decades to receive her husbands pension. No case was ever brought against Roeder to determine if his method of using torture to obtain information or the sentences he pursued in court constituted crimes. In 1957, Roeder planned to sue the surviving defendants in civil court for damages. It wasn't until 2009 that the German Bundestag overturned the verdicts handed down by the Nazi judiciary for "war treason," thereby rehabilitating the members of the Red Orchestra.

== Political Activities ==
Despite the investigations pending against him, Roeder was politically active again as early as the late 1940s. He gave public lectures on the Red Orchestra as early as 1948, and did so again in 1951 during the Lower Saxony state election campaign on behalf of the right-wing extremist Socialist Reich Party (SRP). In numerous newspaper articles and in his book *Die Rote Kapelle: Aufzeichnungen des Generalrichters Dr. M. Roeder* (Hamburg, 1952)—in which he vilified members of the resistance group as traitors and spies—he continued his smear campaign against members of the "Red Orchestra" as well as Bonhoeffer, Dohnanyi, and Josef Müller, thereby influencing the historical assessment and portrayal of this group and these individuals for a considerable time. On 6 May 1951, the illustrated magazine Stern produced a 9-part series, published over several months that broadly followed the same perspective as Roeder—the moral condemnation of the Red Orchestra resistance group as traitors. In 1952, Roeder published "Red Orchestra. European Espionage. Notes of Judge Advocate Dr. M. Roeder", a 36-page pamphlet, partially written by one of his daughters, where he again attacked the resistance group in a document full of fabrications and falsities. Amongst the many points he made, he claimed the resistance organisation was not German, saw the victims of his justice as perpetrators, claimed the group led to the death 200000 soldiers and claimed it was still active. Roeder's central thesis, of treason, was adopted by West German historians, particularly Gerhard Ritter's "Goerdeler and the German Resistance Movement (Carl Goerdeler und die Deutsche Widerstandsbewegung) (1954). Ritter focused more on the resisters values and ideas. Ritter stated that not every resister who was unsatisfied or criticised the Nazis could be included in the German resistance movement. He was vehement in stating that socialist opposition against the Nazi state did not deserve the honorary title of Resistance. In his evaluation he stated, The group had apparently nothing to do with German Resistance, one should have no doubts about this....Any person who can persuade a German soldier to defect or betray important secrets...is a traitor.

After the Federal Constitutional Court banned the SRP in 1952, Roeder presented his lectures at events organised by the right-wing extremist German Reich Party (DRP). During the investigation into Otto John, the former president of the Federal Office for the Protection of the Constitution, who was accused of treason, Roeder was even consulted as an expert on Soviet and communist espionage activities by the Chief Federal Prosecutor at the Federal Court of Justice. Furthermore, in 1957, he appeared as a witness for the defence in the trial of former Field Marshal Ferdinand Schörner, who had ordered the execution of German soldiers without trial.

== Final Years ==
Roeder sold the estate in Neetze in 1961 and, from 1963 onwards, lived in Glashütten (Hesse) on his substantial pension as a military judge. There is no evidence to confirm whether he also practised law, as some books claim; he certainly did not do so in Glashütten. Despite his past association with the Nazi regime—though he had not been a party member—he was elected to the municipal executive board in 1964 by eight of the nine members of the municipal council, and in 1968, he was elected First Deputy Mayor by five of the nine votes. This role, which he held for two and a half years, entailed, among other duties, deputising for the mayor during the latter's absence. Following his death on 18 October 1971, Roeder was buried in the estate cemetery in Neetze.

Manfred Roeder had a son of the same name (born 1937); however, he is not to be confused with the right-wing extremist Manfred Roeder, who was born in Berlin in 1929.

== Publications ==
Roeders only book was published in 1952:

- Roeder, Manfred (1952). Die rote Kapelle. Aufzeichnungen des Generalrichters M. Roeder [The Red Orchestra. Records of Judge Advocate General M. Roeder.] (in German). Hamburg: Hans Siep.
