= Adolf Grimme =

German politician (1889–1963)

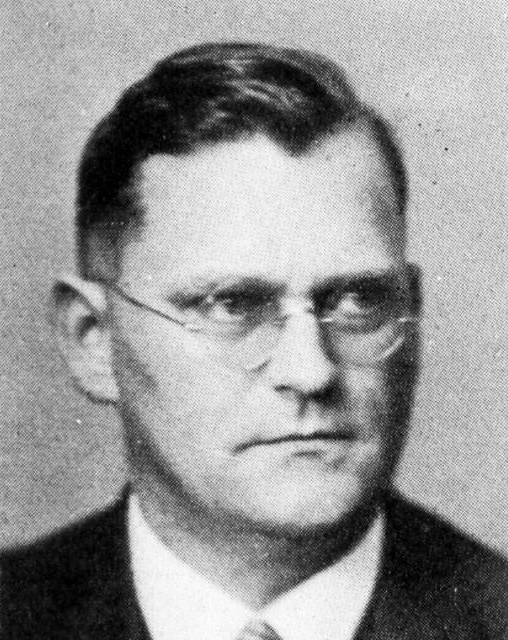
- Grimme c. 1932

Minister of Science, Art and Education of the Free State of Prussia
- In office 30 January 1930 – 20 July 1932
- Minister-president: Otto Braun
- Preceded by: Carl Heinrich Becker
- Succeeded by: Aloys Lammers

Minister of Culture of Lower Saxony
- In office 25 November 1946 – 15 November 1948
- Minister-president: Hinrich Wilhelm Kopf
- Preceded by: Office established
- Succeeded by: Hinrich Wilhelm Kopf

Personal details
- Born: 31 December 1889 Goslar, Province of Hanover, Kingdom of Prussia, German Empire
- Died: 27 August 1963 (aged 73) Brannenburg, Bavaria, West Germany
- Party: Social Democratic Party of Germany
- Education: University of Halle; Ludwig-Maximilians-Universität München; University of Göttingen
- Occupation: School teacher

Adolf Berthold Ludwig Grimme (31 December 1889 – 27 August 1963) was a German politician, a member of the Social Democratic Party (SPD). He was the cultural minister in the Free State of Prussia during the later years of the Weimar Republic and after World War II, during the early years of the Federal Republic of Germany. During Nazi Germany, he was arrested as a member of the German Resistance and sentenced to prison. After the war, he filed a legal complaint against the judge who had condemned him and others. After years of delays, the case was dropped by the prosecutor.

== Life before 1945 ==
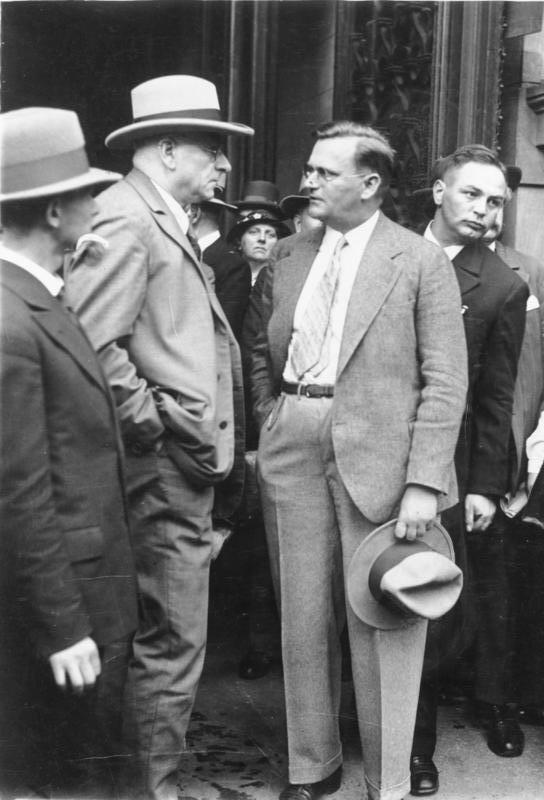
Otto Braun (left) and Adolf Grimme in front of the Prussian Landtag, 24 May 1932

Grimme was born in Goslar, Prussian Hanover, the son of Louise, née Sander (1858–1952) and Adolf Grimme (1854–1906), a train station master. In 1908, he began studying philosophy and German studies, attending the University of Halle, the Ludwig-Maximilians-Universität München and the University of Göttingen. He was also involved in the free student reform movement. He finished passing his state exams in philosophy in 1914. In 1922, he became a member of the SPD. He began teaching in 1924. He then became a senior teacher (Oberstudienrat) in Hanover and in 1925, he became the superintendent in Magdeburg.

Grimme became the assistant minister at the Prussian Ministry of Culture (officially, the Ministry of Science, Art and Education, and a year later, the vice president of the provincial school council of Berlin and Mark Brandenburg. In 1930, he became the successor to Carl Heinrich Becker, serving as the last culture minister of the democratically elected state government of Otto Braun in Prussia. He was removed from this position on 20 July 1932 when the state government was deposed by Franz von Papen in the Prussian coup. He sat as a member of the Landtag of Prussia from the election of April 1932 until that body was dissolved by the Nazis in October 1933.

Grimme belonged to the Covenant of Religious Socialists. In 1942, his house was searched because of his connections to the Red Orchestra and he was arrested by the Gestapo. In 1943, he was brought before the Reich court martial. A good defense strategy, which mainly consisted of informing on his fellow Red Orchestra members, enabled him to avoid the death penalty facing him and he was sentenced to three years in a labor prison (Zuchthaus), condemned for "failure to report an attempt at high treason". The Gestapo failed to uncover his participation in the German Resistance as author of many fliers then in circulation. Under the Third Reich, the crime of Wehrkraftzersetzung was punishable by death. Grimme's prison term was spent at the prisons in Luckau and Fuhlsbüttel.

== Post-war life ==
Although not given to revenge, on 15 September 1945 Grimme filed a complaint with the state's attorney against Manfred Roeder for his involvement condemning to death or imprisonment 49 members of the Red Orchestra, including Dietrich Bonhoeffer, Hans von Dohnanyi, Arvid Harnack and Günther Weisenborn.

Dated 12 May 1951, the final report by Hans-Jürgen Finck, Lüneburg state's attorney, about the investigation into the complaint filed by Grimme and other surviving Red Orchestra members came to the conclusion that the Reich court martial trials had been conducted "in accordance with the law" (ordnungsgemäß) and the defendants correctly sentenced to death. "The basis of the 'Red Orchestra'... was treason. Treason... has ever and in all ages been regarded as the most ignominious crime. ... Also, the 20 July Plot was in profound measure fueled by treason and espionage." The report further stated that the military opposition had "assumed... an enormous amount of guilt". Other German men disagreed with Hitler and the war, but nonetheless "did their duty as soldiers and in administration and the economy... [and] certainly would have rejected with outrage... being placed in the same league with men like Beck, Canaris, Oster [and] von Dohnanyi." (Note: Lüneburg state's attorney Hans-Jürgen Finck also wrote, "the Gestapo was an absolutely normal police organization" and he pointed to "the majority of surviving witnesses... from people, who obsessed over a boundless hate of the National Socialist state". The ruling was in line with an earlier decision by the U.S. military, which in 1946, investigated the death of Red Orchestra member Mildred Harnack. It found that the Nazi court's death sentence had been justified.)

The case, also pursued by Weisenborn and Greta Kuckhoff, was delayed by the state's attorney in Lüneburg until the end of the 1960s, when it was dropped.

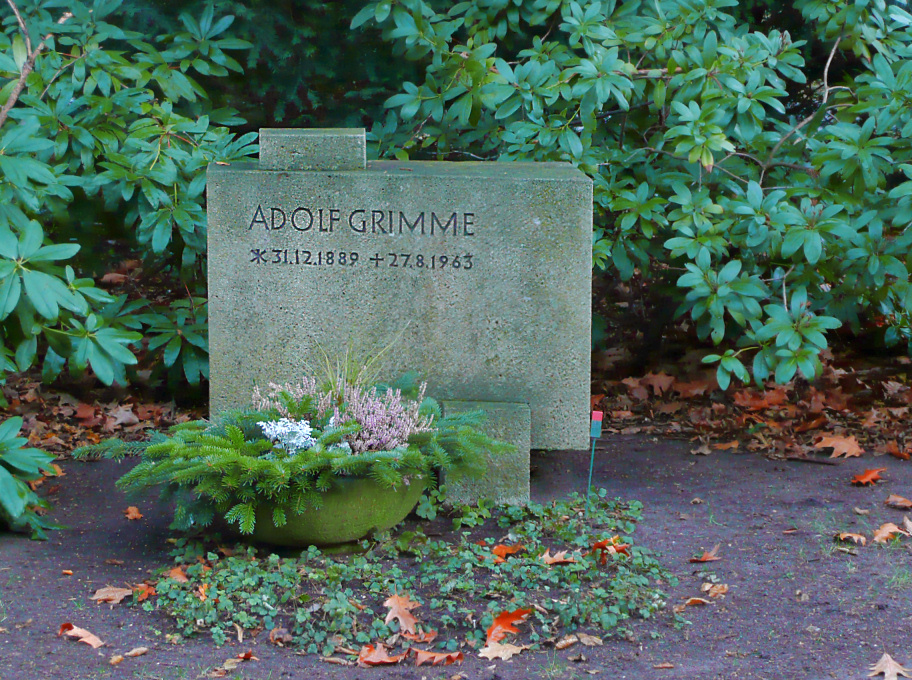
Grimme's gravestone

Grimme was a member of the postwar "appointed Landtag" organized by the British military government in their occupation zone. It existed for just a few months, from 23 August 1946 to 8 December 1946. After the British created the German state of Lower Saxony, he became a member of the appointed Landtag of Lower Saxony, which existed from 8 December 1946 to 28 March 1947. When the elections were held, he became a member of the first elected Landtag, later becoming the first Minister of Culture of Lower Saxony. On 15 November 1948, Grimme was named the first General Manager of Nordwestdeutscher Rundfunk. In 1956, he retired to Degerndorf am Inn in the municipality of Brannenburg.

A well-known quote from Adolf Grimme is "A socialist can be a Christian. A Christian must be a socialist."

== Legacy ==
Over the decades since his death, Grimme has become a "name without a history". An annual television prize, the most prestigious in Germany, is named for him, the Adolf Grimme Award. Known since 2010 as the Grimme Award, it was first awarded by the City of Marl training institute in 1964. In 1973, a media institute named after Grimme was founded in Marl, and has given out the Grimme Award since 1977, expanded in 2001 to include new media. A biography about Grimme was published in 2008, helping to "return the missing history" to Grimme's name.
