= Cieśle, Lower Silesian Voivodeship =

Cieśle
- Village
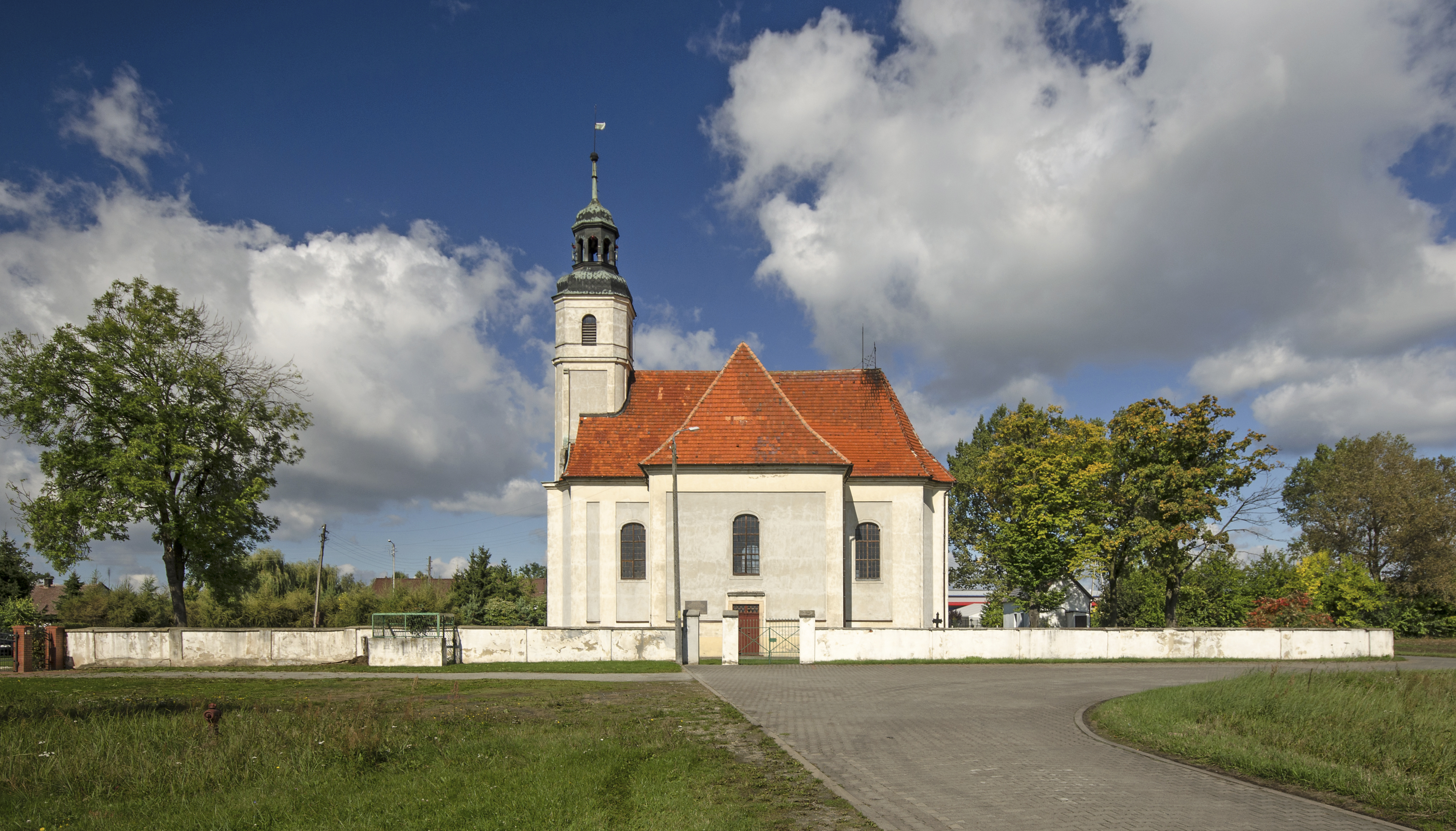
- Church of the Virgin Mary

- Location within Poland
- Coordinates: 51°13′27″N 17°28′24″E
- Country: Poland
- Voivodeship: Lower Silesian
- County: Oleśnica
- Gmina: Gmina Oleśnica
- Time zone: UTC+1 (CET)
  - Summer (DST): UTC+2 (CEST)
- Vehicle registration: DOL

Cieśle [ˈt͡ɕɛɕlɛ] is a village in the administrative district of Gmina Oleśnica, within Oleśnica County, Lower Silesian Voivodeship, in south-western Poland.

== Notable residents ==
- August Ludwig von Nostitz, Prussian general
- Renata von Scheliha, German classical philologist
- Rudolf von Scheliha (1897-1942), German diplomat executed by the German Nazis during World War II
