= Marie Louise von Scheliha =

German noblewoman and wife of Rudolf von Scheliha

- Marie von Scheliha was a tireless campaigner to clear her husbands name.
- Born: 21 May 1904; Silesia, German Empire
- Died: 2 April 2003 (aged 98); Switzerland
- Education: University of Oxford, Vienna School of Arts and Crafts
- Occupations: Diplomat wife, resistance fighter
- Known for: Working to clear her husbands name
- Spouse: Rudolf von Scheliha
- Children: Sylvia von Scheliha, Elisabeth Teresita von Scheliha

Marie Louisa Emilia Sofia Edle von Scheliha (born Marie Louise von Medinger; 21 May 1904 – 2 April 2003) was a German noblewoman and wife of the resistance fighter Rudolf von Scheliha. As a child, von Scheliha grew up in Karlštejn Castle and was privately educated before attending the University of Oxford and the Vienna School of Arts and Crafts. In 1927, she met and married the diplomat Rudolf von Scheliha and became a diplomats wife, working in different diplomatic missions in Czechoslovakia, Turkey and later Poland during the 1930's. With the coming of the Nazis, the couple began to consciously resist in the late-1930's, helping friends escape the Nazis. When her husband became the director of the Information department in the Federal Foreign Office, the couple learned of the true nature of the Nazis and were able to pass information on Aktion T4 and the Final Solution to the allies. Inevitably, the Nazis discovered her husbands activities and both were arrested. While she was released in November 1943, her husband was tried and executed in December 1942 at Plötzensee Prison, as a member of the Rote Kapelle.

After the war, she began a campaign to rehabilitate her husbands reputation, who was seen as a traitor, that took several decades. In the mid-1980's she received help from the retired diplomat Ulrich Sahm who began writing a biography on her husband. By 1995, her husband was officially rehabilitated and was seen as "daring and honourable resistance fighter", unconnected to the Rote Kapelle.

== Life ==
Marie Louisa Emilia Sofia Edle von Medinger was born on 21 May 1904 at Karlštejn Castle in Bohemia. The castle, which is now located in the Czech Republic between the towns of Jablonec nad Nisou (then Gablonz) and Turnov (then Turnau), was a property once belonging to the Habsburg Monarchy. Her father was Wilhelm von Medinger an industrialist, who had a degree in agriculture and a doctorate in philosophy and had acquired the estate from the Austrian politician Ludwig von Oppenheimer two years before she was born. He was also a member of the Bohemian Parliament for ten years. Her mother was Alice Pfersmann von Eichthal (1879-1969).

Marie Louise von Medinger mainly received private tuition, but also attended the Nôtre Dame de Sion convent school in Vienna for a short time. In 1920, she attended her first ball and became engaged against her parents' wishes. She was therefore sent to University of Oxford by her father in order to break the engagement without making a sound. She then studied at the Notre Dame de Sion convent school in Vienna before studying at the School of Arts and Crafts in Gablonz. As her artistic talent was discovered there, she went on to study at the Vienna School of Arts and Crafts. Before entering professional life, however, she opted for an aristocratic life, partly due to a lack of schooling, as she later admitted. In 1927, she married the aristocratic diplomat Rudolf von Scheliha, whom she met at a ball in Prague. On 14 November 1930, she had a daughter Sylvia von Scheliha, who required increased care due to bone marrow infection and went on to become an engineer. The couples second child Elisabeth Teresita von Scheliha (1934-2016), became a chemist.

== Diplomat's wife ==
Von Scheliha moved to Constantinople with her husband after their honeymoon in 1927. In the same year, the couple moved on to Ankara, which became the new capital of Turkey. A miscarriage was a decisive experience that put a heavy strain on Scheliha. 16 months later, her husband was transferred to Katowice. On 14 November 1930, she had a daughter Sylvia von Scheliha, who required increased care due to bone marrow infection. In October 1932, her husband began working in Warsaw, where Hans-Adolf von Moltke placed him. Their second daughter Sylvia was born on 9 March 1934. Sylvia became an engineer in 1923, and Elisabeth received a doctorate in chemistry, with the latter surviving to 2016 and dying in Adliswil.

The diplomatic couple devoted themselves to playing bridge and hunting. At these social events, they met Nazi celebrities such as Hermann Göring and Joachim von Ribbentrop, who entertained them.

In 1936, Rudolf von Scheliha tried to use a trip to Kraków and Zakopane with Hans Frank of the Reich Legal Office of the Nazis and Hitler's personal lawyer, to warn the Polish nobility about Adolf Hitler, but his carelessness put himself in danger. Around 1938–1939, he began to consciously resist. He used his influence to save his friends from persecution by the Nazis and thus put himself in danger. He also used his later position in the protocol department of the Federal Foreign Office in Berlin to pass on so-called “atrocity propaganda”, which he was actually supposed to monitor and combat. Rudolf von Scheliha was arrested on 29 October 1942 and assigned to the resistance group Rote Kapelle, to which he neither belonged nor had any connections. He was tortured, forced to confess and was executed in Plötzensee Prison on 22 December 1942.

== Arrest ==
The Nazi German tradition of Sippenhaft meant that many family members of the accused were also arrested. This resulted in Marie Louise von Scheliha being arrested on 29 October 1943 and taken to Kantstraße women's prison. She was also repeatedly interrogated and threatened and was only released on 6 November 1943. She was forced to leave Berlin and moved with her children to live with her sister in Vienna.

== End of war ==
In the last days of the war, she fled with her daughters via Prague to Niederstetten in Bavaria. In Haltenbergstetten Castle, the family lived in a cellar room and subsisted mainly on mushrooms, berries and fallen fruit. She also worked illegally in the fields. She lived a miserable existence during these years. After the end of the war, friends brought von Scheliha and her family to Würzburg and in 1951 she moved to Munich, where she became a housewife. Von Schehila had not bothered with resistance activities during the Third Reich and he had not initiated them, not least to protect her. Now that she was facing financial ruin, she tried to get reparation payments.

During the trial against Manfred Roeder, the chief prosecutor against her husband, she tried to find out from Robert Kemper, the presiding judge in the case, what her husband was actually accused of. However, Roeder only answered her questions with mockery. Kemper therefore did not even forward the letter. Since, according to the court, her husband had belonged to the Red Orchestra and therefore to the Communists at the time, she was denied restitution. However, she received some aid from the state of Württemberg-Baden and a widow's pension from 28 November 1950. In 1952, von Scheliha applied for compensation but was refused as her husband was not classified as a resistance fighter, but as a traitor. The Foreign Office adopted this attitude and for more than 50 years it refused to recognise Von Scheliha due to the findings of the 1942 Gestapo investigation. This led to a lengthy dispute in which Rudolf von Scheliha's role in the resistance was repeatedly investigated. Attempts were made to persuade Marie Louise von Scheliha to withdraw her application for restitution and she was put under pressure. The publication of Manfred Roeders book "Die Rote Kapelle" in 1952 had effectively soured the public perception of the resistance fighters in the Rote Kapelle, including von Scheliha. In January 1956, von Scheliha petitioned the West German president Theodor Heuss who pardoned her husband and granted her a "revocable maintenance contribution amounting to the legal widow's daily needs". The size of the contribution left her impoverished at the same time as widows of Nazis prosecutors had received full pension rights.

== Rehabilitation ==
From the mid-80's onward, the retired diplomat Ulrich Sahm campaigned to rehabilitate her husband. It wasn't until 1990, that Rudolf von Scheliha was rehabilitated with the publication of Sahm's book: "Rudolf von Scheliha 1897–1942. Ein deutscher Diplomat gegen Hitler" (Rudolf von Scheliha 1897-1942: A German diplomat against Hitler). The biography was based on extensive conversations with Marie Louise von Scheliha. Sahm reframes her husband as a "daring and honourable resistance fighter". In the spring of 1990, Sahm approached German minister and diplomat Jürgen Sudhoff to host the book presentation in the Foreign Ministry offices. However, Ludwig Biewer, the director of the archives of the Foreign Ministry rejected the book in a motion that described it as "frivolous and unworthy" with unreliable sources. At the same time, he stated he believed that Roeders book was credible, effectively stopping the book launch. As the matter was not settled, Sudhoff sought a second opinion with the ministries lawyers, who supported Sudhoff, even though they knew that von Scheliha had been tortured by the Gestapo.

== Trial ==
In 1992, Von Scheliha made a request to the Württemberg State Office for a full pension benefits and was again refused in 1993, as her husband has been subject to a "proper trial". The continual requests risked an open scandal and to mitigate it, the Foreign Ministry approached the Supreme Administrative Office (Bundesverwaltungsamt) who prepared a case to restore full pension rights and in turn rehabilitate von Scheliha. A case was opened with the Cologne Administrative Court in Cologne. Sahm's research was the likely basis for the Cologne Administrative Court to rule in October 1995 that Scheliha had been sentenced to death not for espionage but in a sham trial for his opposition to Nazism, which overturned the 1942 verdict, making him officially and legally rehabilitated. The court stated that "Scheliha had been persecuted because of his political opposition". Marie-Louise von Scheliha lived to see this in her old age, surrounded by her family in Switzerland, where she spent the last years of her life. She died in Switzerland on 2 April 2003.
