= August Ludwig von Nostitz =

Prussian general (1777–1866)

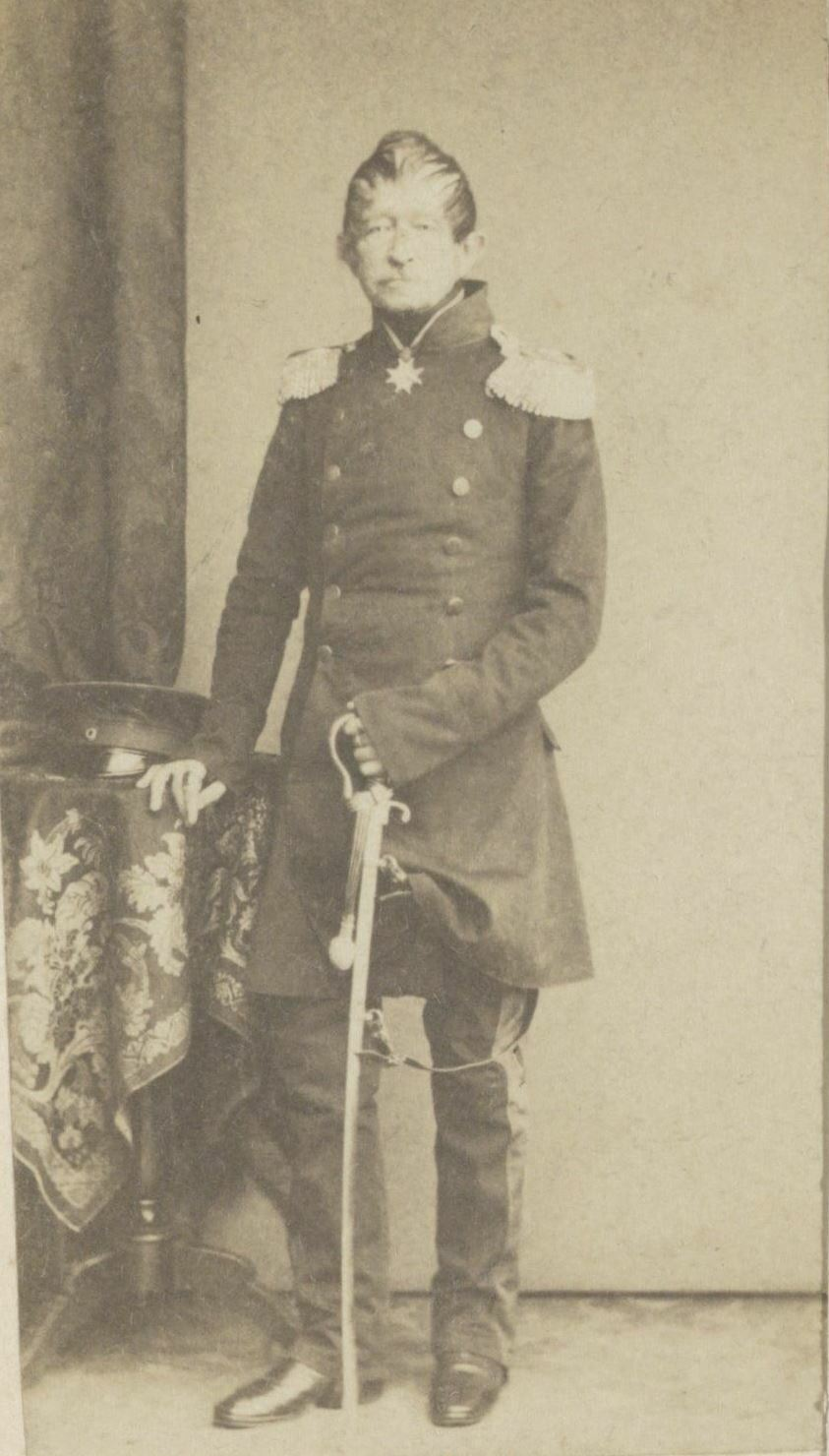
Von Nostitz

August Ludwig Ferdinand Count von Nostitz-Ransen (27 December 1777 in Zessel, near Öls – 28 May 1866 on his estates at Zobten, near Löwenberg in Schlesien) was a Prussian general who acted as adjutant general to Frederick William III of Prussia.

== Early life ==
August Ludwig was born as the eldest son of Count Georg August von Nostitz-Ransen (1709-1795) and his wife Baroness Johanna Christine Eleonore von Reiszwitz-Kaderzin (1756-1840). His siblings included Count Karl Wilhelm (1783-1850), Count Ludwig Georg (1784-1839), Countess Eleonore von Dyhrn (1787-1853) and Friederike Henriette von Rosen (1781-1871), countess Martha Henriette (1785-1862) von Tschirschky.

== Military career ==
He joined the Prussian Army in 1802, leaving it in 1810 only to return in 1813 as a staff officer of the Silesian uhlans. After the battle of Bautzen he became adjutant to Gebhard Leberecht von Blücher.

On 16 June 1815, towards the end of the battle of Ligny, Nostitz stood guard over Blücher after Blücher fell stunned under his horse and after the French Cuirassiers had passed attracted the attention of counter charging Prussian troopers who then remounted the dazed Blücher on Sergeant Schneider's horse and escorted him from the battlefield.

Nostitz became a major general in 1825 and served on Nicholas I of Russia's general staff during the Russo-Turkish War (1828–1829).

In 1833 Nostitz became deputy commander of Berlin, then lieutenant general in 1838 and commander of the 5th Hussar Regiment (the Blüchersche Husaren) in 1840. He left active service in May 1848, was promoted to general of the cavalry in 1849 and from 1850 to 1860 served as Prussian ambassador to the Kingdom of Hanover.

== Marriage and issue ==
In 1829 August Georg married Countess Klara Louise Auguste von Hatzfeldt-Trachenberg (1807-1858), daughter of Prince Franz Ludwig von Hatzfeldt-Trachenberg (1756-1827) and Countess Friederike von der Schulenburg-Kennerth (1779-1832). They had one son and two daughters:

- Countess Maria von Nostitz-Ransen (b. 1832)
- Countess Anna von Nostitz-Ransen (1833-1870); married Count Alexander von Strachwitz von Gross-Zauche und Camminetz (1817-1866) and had issue.
- Count Wilhelm Friedrich von Nostitz-Ransen (1835-1916); married Eleonore Alexandrine von Johnston und Kroegeborn (1868-1938) and had issue

== Honours ==
He received the following orders and decorations:

- Kingdom of Prussia:
  - Knight of the Black Eagle, with Collar
  - Knight of the Red Eagle, 1st Class
  - Pour le Mérite (military), with Oak Leaves
  - Iron Cross, 1st Class
  - Service Award Cross
- Austrian Empire:
  - Knight of the Military Order of Maria Theresa
  - Knight of the Imperial Order of Leopold
- Kingdom of Bavaria: Grand Cross of the Order of Merit of the Bavarian Crown
- Brunswick: Grand Cross of the Order of Henry the Lion
- Kingdom of Hanover: Grand Cross of the Royal Guelphic Order
- (Hohenzollern-Sigmaringen) Hohenzollern: Cross of Honour of the Princely House Order of Hohenzollern, 1st Class
- Oldenburg: Grand Cross of the Order of Duke Peter Friedrich Ludwig
- Russian Empire:
  - Knight of St. Alexander Nevsky
  - Knight of the White Eagle
  - Knight of St. Anna, 1st Class
  - Knight of St. Stanislaus, 1st Class
  - Knight of St. George, 4th Class
  - Knight of St. Vladimir, 2nd Class
- Saxe-Weimar-Eisenach: Commander of the White Falcon, 2nd Class
- Sweden: Knight of the Sword
