= Rudolf von Scheliha =

German resistance fighter (1897–1942)

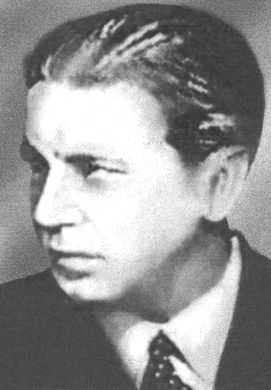
- Born: 31 May 1897; Zessel, Oels, Silesia, Prussia
- Died: 22 December 1942 (aged 45); Plötzensee Prison, Berlin, Nazi Germany
- Cause of death: Execution by hanging
- Education: University of Breslau, University of Heidelberg
- Occupations: Diplomat, resistance fighter
- Employer: Foreign Office
- Known for: Created a comprehensive library of German occupation crimes, on the atrocities of the Gestapo.
- Political party: Nazi Party
- Spouse: Marie Louise von Medinger
- Children: 2
- Relatives: Renata von Scheliha (sister)

Rudolf "Dolf" von Scheliha (31 May 1897 – 22 December 1942) was a German aristocrat, cavalry officer and diplomat who became a resistance fighter and anti-Nazi who was incorrectly linked to the Red Orchestra espionage group.

He fought in World War I, an experience that defined his politics and made him a pacifist. He joined the German Foreign Office, was trained to be a diplomat and was sent to the embassy in Warsaw, in position of trust in the Foreign Office. In the years leading up to the Second World War, he became a committed opponent of the Nazi regime and of its antisemitic policies. In 1937, he was recruited by Soviet intelligence, while he served in Warsaw. When World War II started, he passed documents to Soviet intelligence through his contacts Rudolf Herrnstadt and later Ilse Stöbe.

In September 1939, he began working in the information department in the Foreign Ministry, which was established to counter enemy propaganda. As part of his position, photographs of atrocities against Jews and other people passed through his department and were used in propaganda. Appalled at what he saw, he began to resist and built a dossier of the worst images over several years. In 1940, he helped several of his Polish friends flee abroad after the Invasion of Poland, In 1941, when he learned of the murders of the Polish intelligensia during operation Sonderaktion Krakau, he protested to Reinhard Heydrich, which enabled him to save the lifes of several Polish academics. During that period, he continued to save documents for his portfolio. It was eventually smuggled to London in January 1942. Later in the war, he tried to warn Swiss diplomats about the Aktion T4 campaign. In June 1941, after the invasion of the Soviet Union, his controller Ilse Stöbe lost contact. Soviet intelligence tried several times to reinitiate communications with her but were unsuccessful. A blunder by Soviet intelligence that exposed Stöbe's address, led her and von Scheliha to being discovered in July 1942 by German military intelligence. Stöbe was arrested in 12 September 1942, Von Scheliha on 29 October 1942. He was tried by the Reichskriegsgericht and executed by hanging in Plötzensee Prison on 14 December 1942.

After the war, Von Scheliha was seen as a traitor and his wife Marie Louise von Scheliha and children were left destitute. In the decades after the war, she worked tirelessly to rehabilitate her husbands reputation, eventually succeeding in the late 1990's with the help of Ulrich Sahm, who wrote a biography of von Scheliha that described him as a "daring and honourable resistance fighter".

== Life ==
Rudolf von Scheliha was born in Zessel, Oels, Silesia (now Cieśle, Oleśnica, Poland), as the son of the Prussian aristocrat and officer Rudolph von Scheliha (1865–1946). His mother was the Marie Luise von Scheliha née Miquel (1876–1942) who was a daughter of Lord Mayor of Frankfurt and Prussian Finance Minister Johann von Miquel. His younger sister, Renata von Scheliha (1901–1967), was a classical philologist.

In 1927, Rudolf married the noblewomen Marie Louise von Scheliha (1904–2003) née von Medinger, the daughter of a large landowner and industrialist. The couple had two daughters: Sylvia, born on 14 November 1930, and Elisabeth, born in 1934. Sylvia became an engineer, and Elisabeth received a doctorate in chemistry, with the latter surviving to 2016 and dying in Adliswil.

== Military ==
He served as an army officer in World War I and volunteered after his graduation in 1915. Scheliha volunteered at the same regiment, the Cavalry Rifle Regiment, Guard Cavalry Rifle Division, in which his father and uncle had served; its officers were drawn from the nobility.

On 8 August 1918, he was shelled in a ditch with two brothers, who were blown up, and one brother died months later from his injuries. Scheliha was buried; when he was rescued, his hair had turned grey, and he was suffering from shell shock, a type of post-traumatic stress disorder. His parents were shocked at the change but he never spoke of his experiences. The experience left a pacifist. He was honoured for his efforts by both Iron Crosses and the Silver Wound Badge.

== Education ==
After the war, he studied law in Breslau. In May 1919, he moved to the University of Heidelberg, where he joined the Corps Saxo-Borussia that year and came in contact with republican and anti-totalitarian groups. He was elected to the AStA, the General Student Committee (Students Union), where he vehemently opposed the students' antisemitic riots.

== Career ==
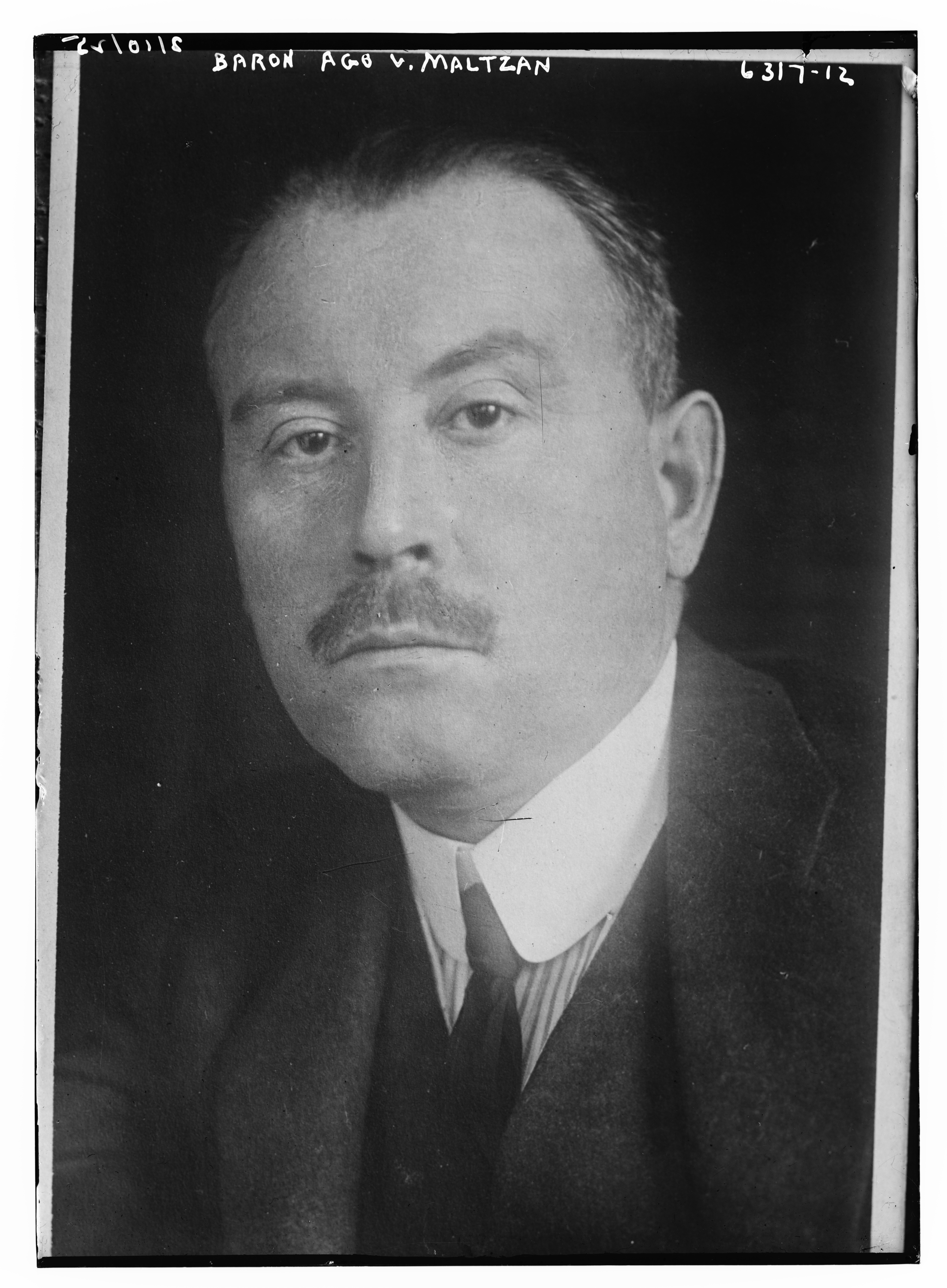
von Scheliha first worked for von Maltzan in the department of East European affairs in the Hamburg Foreign Office

After his examination in 1921, he became first clerk at the Court of Appeal in 1922. In February 1922, von Scheliha joined the regional office of the Foreign Office in Hamburg. After six months, he was promoted to attaché. He began to work in the department responsible for East European affairs in the office of Undersecretary of State Adolf Georg von Maltzan in Berlin. In December 1924, he was promoted again and was admitted to the diplomatic service. Over the following years, von Scheliha took over tasks in the diplomatic missions of Prague, Constantinople, Angora and Brno. In 1927, he was appointed to the position of legation secretary. In 1929, von Scheliha was appointed to the position of vice-consul at the Germany embassy in Katowice. At the time he tried to solve several intractable problems in the relations between Germany and Poland that had reached a new low, by maintaining an open house where he invited members of the Polish elite to talk to embassy staff. He hoped the convivial environment combined with common shared values would lead to an improvement in relations.

In July 1933, a few months after Adolf Hitler's appointment as Reichskanzler, von Scheliha became a member of the Nazi Party, a requirement as a diplomat, resulting in him participating in the Nuremberg Rally. At the time, he didn't understand the threat of fascism that the Nazi Party posed.

=== Warsaw ===
From 1932 to 1939, von Scheliha was a member of the German embassy in Warsaw. In October 1932, he joined the embassy staff as a Legation Secretary. While in Warsaw, Von Scheliha became part of a group of left-leaning, liberal anti-nazis that met regularly. By 1936, these included his colleagues the ambassador Hans-Adolf von Moltke who he was on first name terms, the press-secretary Hans Graf Huyn, the Polish writer Jarosław Iwaszkiewicz, poet Julian Tuwim, the actress Ida Kaminska, Polish foreign minister Josef Beck. His close friends were the Polish Countess Klementyna Mańkowska and Count Konstantin Bninski (1889–1972) and the German journalist Immanuel Birnbaum who was the foreign correspondent for the Frankfurter Zeitung and Vossische Zeitung. Also in the group was Rudolf Herrnstadt, the foreign correspondent for the left-wing Berliner Tageblatt who had moved to Warsaw in 1931 and Ilse Stöbe, the foreign correspondent for the Swiss Neue Zürcher Zeitung newspaper who had moved there in 1935. The couple were Soviet GRU agents.

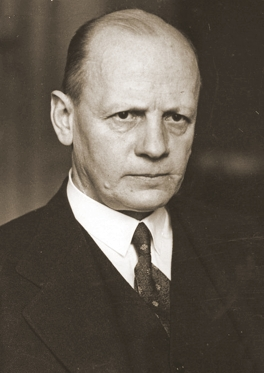
Ambassdor von Moltke had recruited von Scheliha for the Warsaw post as both were members of the Corps Saxo Borussia in Heidelberg as students

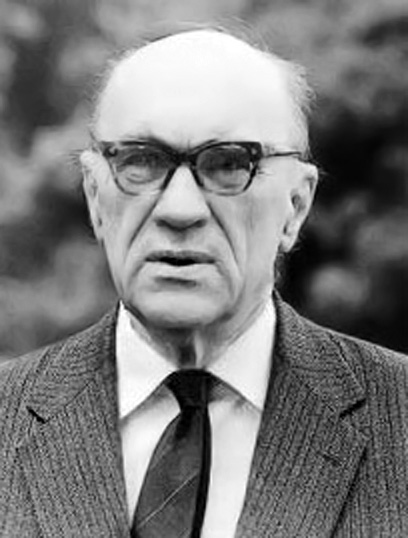
The Polish writer and essayist Jaroslaw Iwaszkiewicz was a close friend of von Scheliha.

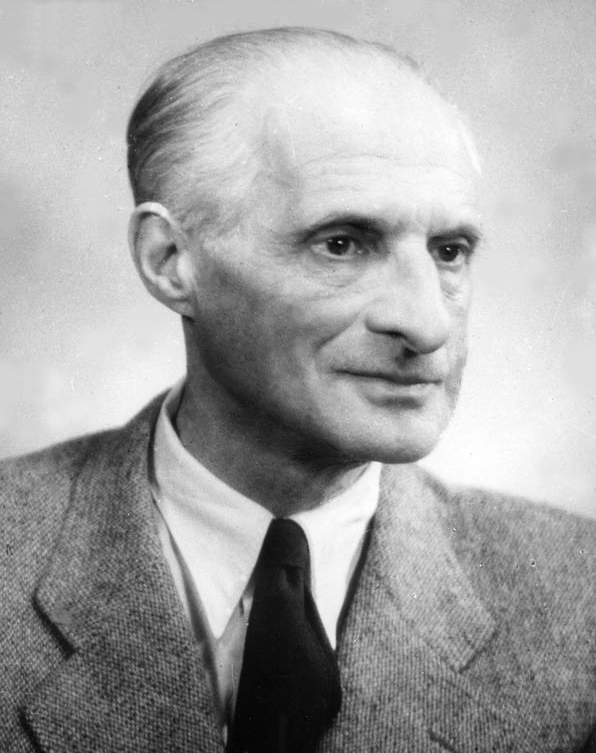
The Polish poet Julian Tuwim was also a close friend of von Scheliha.

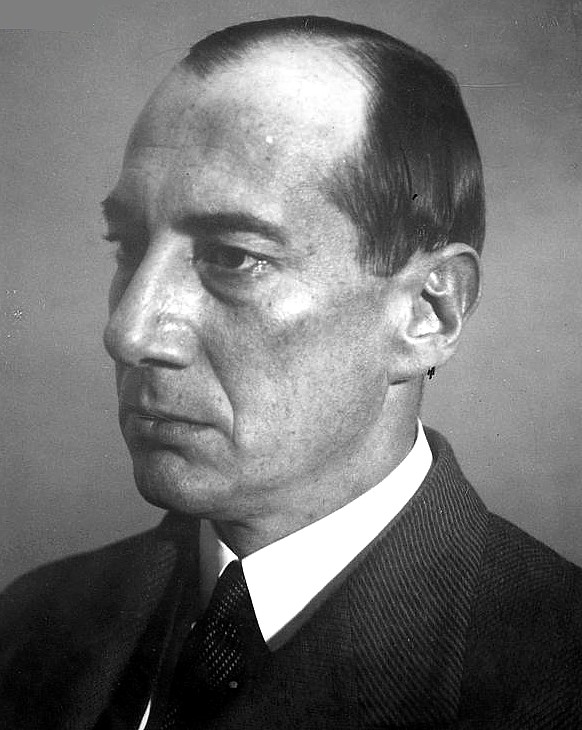
The Polish foreign minister Josef Beck attended the same embassy parties as von Scheliha.

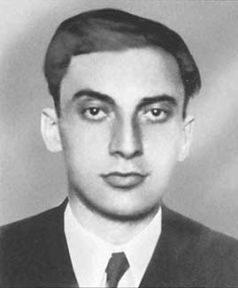
Rudolf Herrnstadt was a Soviet GRU agent who was the rezident in Warsaw. He tricked von Scheliha into becoming an informer.

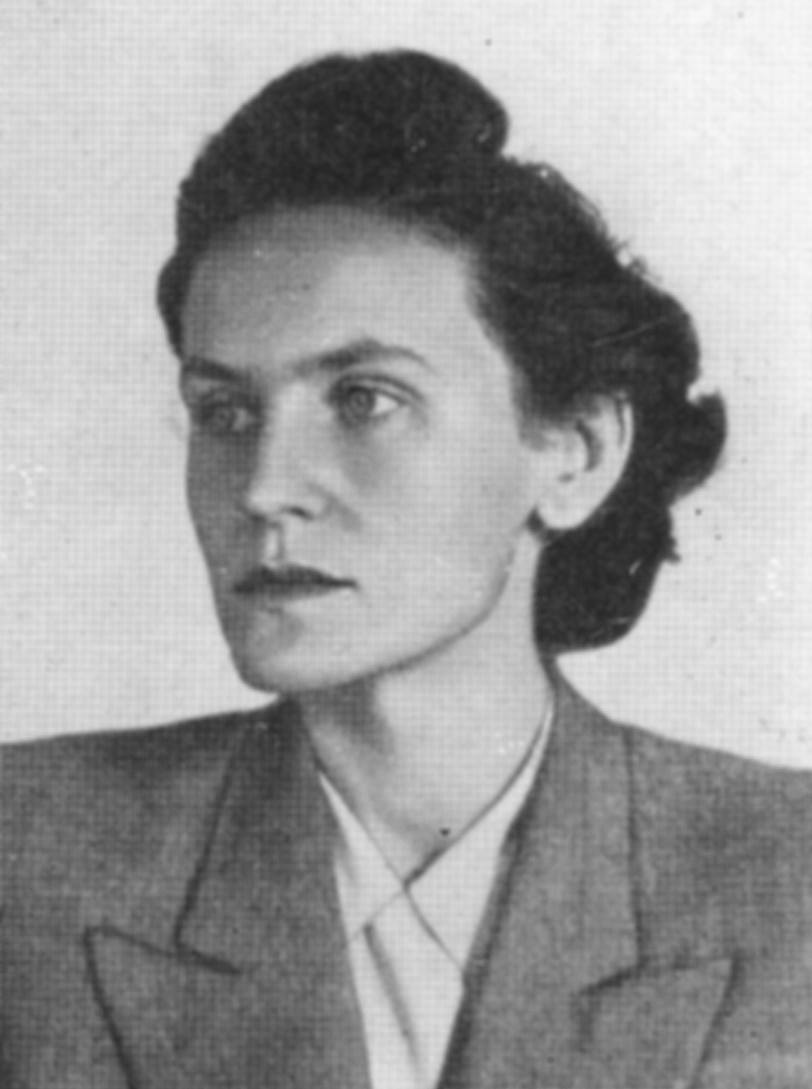
Ilse Stöbe was part of Herrnstadt's espionage cell in Warsaw, as a courier. When Herrnstadt fled to Moscow at the start of the war, she returned to Berlin and became the main rezident.

Von Scheliha work was principally looking after diplomatic guests of the embassy and ensure the correct protocol was followed. After the signing of the German–Polish non-aggression pact in January 1934, the embassy faced a continual stream of new guests whose visits were organised by Von Scheliha. Amongst these were Hermann Göring ostensibly coming to hunt but in reality to satisfy pre-invasion questions and the Nazi foreign minister Joachim von Ribbentrop. In 1936, Von Scheliha arranged a visit for Hitlers lawyer Hans Frank and along with his wife Marie, escorted Frank and his family around the sights of Kraków. When Poland was invaded, Frank became the Governor-General of the vast occupied territories and was responsible for the mass-murder of Jews and the Polish intelligensia.

In August 1936, Von Scheliha and his wife escorted several Polish dignitaries to the 1936 Summer Olympics before going on holiday to East Prussia. He planned to try and warn several members of the Prussian nobility about Hitler. A friend of his sister Renata, Momme Mommsen also a philologist, described how "He wanted to appeal to the conscience of the nobility on the large estates". Von Scheliha tried to describe to the nobility how they would be committing "partial suicide" if they became part of the regime. Mommsen stated, "It is unnecessary to speak about the accuracy of this prophecy. But it is worth remembering how much determination and courage it took to travel around the country with such a slogan". Mommsen noted how brave Von Scheliha was but also careless as he threw caution to the wind, even in Warsaw and put himself in danger with his convictions.

==== Informant ====
Both Herrnstadt and von Scheliha had similar political views on the Nazis, a deep hostility, but had different views on the Soviet Union as von Scheliha was opposed to communism. Both knew that Hitler was going to start a war. When Herrnstadt had to leave his newspaper in 1936 due to the Reich Editors law for being Jewish, it became impossible for Moltke to defend him. Only von Scheliha out of the embassy staff remained in contact but their meetings were secret.

In 1937, while his career progressed with a promotion to Councillor II Class, during the summer, Herrnstadt used subterfuge to trick Von Scheliha into becoming an informant. Herrnstadt did this by disguising the delivery location of any received intelligence, i.e. to show the reports weren't going to the Soviet Union. In 1937, he travelled to England and through a comintern agent Ernest David Weiss and his sub-agent Ilse Steinfeld, a journalist for the Berliner Tageblatt who worked for The Guardian, he met the German legation councillor Hermann von Stutterheim (1887–1959) of the German embassy in London. (Note: Coppi and Kebir mistake the Romanian embassy for the German embassy in the text of Ilse Stöbe: Wieder im Amt in page 52 as Baron Von Stutterheim was a diplomat in the Germany embassy not the Romanian embassy, although refer to the German embassy further on in the text.) When he returned to Warsaw, he informed Von Scheliha that had met a contact in England, who was an "intermediary" for the secret service who was interested in the political situation in Poland. He further informed him that he was authorised to act for this intermediary. This finally convinced Von Scheliha by mid-September to begin supplying embassy reports. (Note: Although von Scheliha trusted Herrnstadt, there is an assumption that he would have checked with Baron Von Stutterheim to verify the visit.) Until September 1939, Herrnstadt passed the documents to the Soviet Embassy in Warsaw through the cutout Stöbe. It is still not known however, whether von Scheliha knew that the reports he was passed to Herrnstadt were being sent to Soviet intelligence.

=== Berlin ===
==== Invasion ====
In August, Herrnstadt met with von Scheliha to inform him that his "wife" Ilse Stöbe would be taking over his duties in Berlin, as he had to leave Poland. As Herrnstadt was Jewish, he would have been the subject to immediate arrest and execution by the Nazis had he remained in Warsaw. Von Scheliha was initially reticent about the decision as he was afraid to expose himself to a third person, but finally accepted the decision. Just before the imminent invasion of Poland by the Wehrmacht in September 1939, Herrnstadt fled to the Soviet Union at the end of August.

==== Information department ====
In September 1939, von Scheliha moved back to Berlin when he was appointed director of an Information Department of the Ministry of Foreign Affairs (Informationsabteilung des Auswärtigen Amtes) that had been created to counter foreign press and radio news propaganda on the German occupation in Poland. Three months later in January 1940, von Scheliha was promoted to director of the "Observation and Combating Polish Propaganda Provocations" ("Beobachtung und Bekämpfung der polnischen Hetzpropaganda") section of the Information department. The position gave him to the foreign press. The appointment allowed him to verify the veracity of foreign reports of German atrocities and to interview Nazi officials. He thoroughly investigated every report he received and would protest against what were in effect Nazi war crimes in Poland.

===== Resistance =====
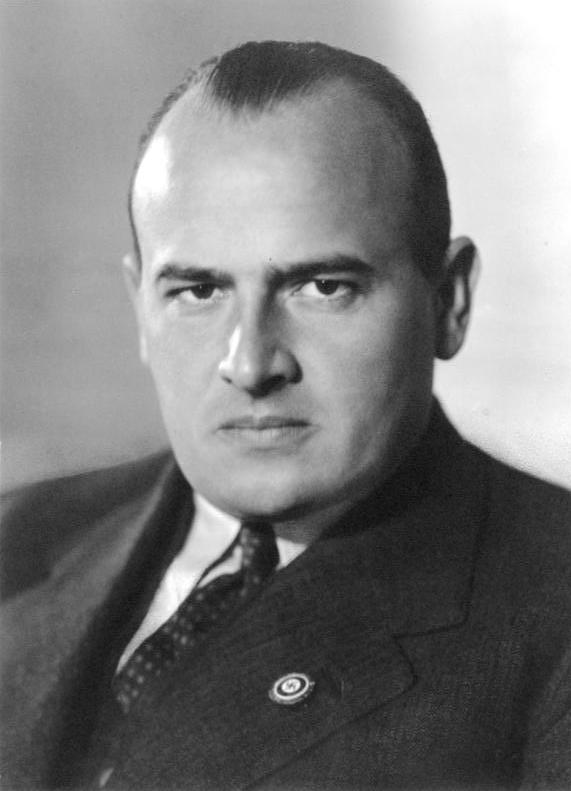
When von Scheliha learned of the atrocities committed by the governor-general of Poland, Hans Frank, he became his implacable enemy.

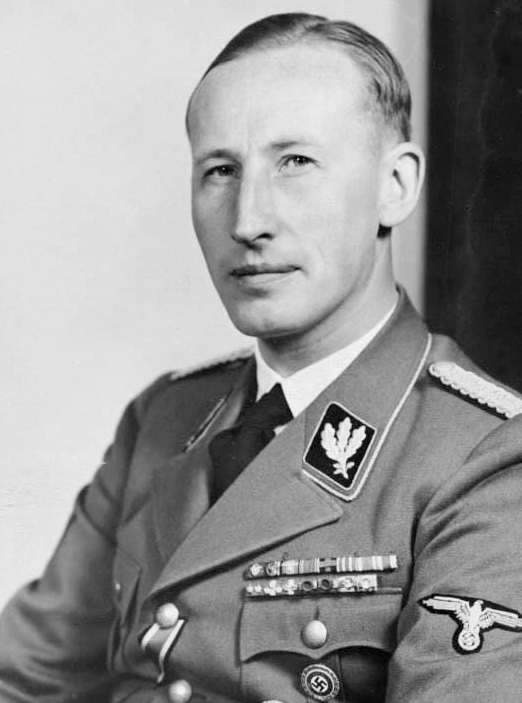
von Scheliha protested to Reinhard Heydrich several times during the autumn of 1939, due to the atrocities resulting from the Intelligenzaktion.

von Scheliha helped Muszkieterzy member Princess Teresa Sapieha-Rozanski to emigrate to Italy

In November 1939 after Sonderaktion Krakau, the arrest of 184 Polish academic staff, a war crime, von Scheliha protested to Reinhard Heydrich. Following international pressure, many of the academic staff were released but many died in German concentration camps. He had several further dealings with Heydrich to protest the imprisonment of his friend, the Austrian Consul General in Munich Victor Jordan. He had warned the Austrian Foreign Ministry about the planned German invasion of Austria and the call was monitored, leading to his arrest. Von Scheliha secured his release on 23 December 1940. As well as being critical of Kleist, when reports of the brutality of Hans Frank appeared in the foreign press, von Scheliha became his most implacable enemy and began to resist.

Von Scheliha also helped Poles and Jews flee abroad. Working either in an official capacity or through a friend, he helped many people escape from Poland and in some cases provided money for travel costs. Amongst these was Princess Teresa Sapieha-Rozanski a member of the Polish Muszkieterzy (organizacja) resistance organisation. In January 1940, von Scheliha helped her to emigrate to Italy. She survived the war.

In May 1940, Von Scheliha helped Stöbe find a job in the Foreign Office, working in subdivision III of the information department where she would write pro-German articles that were published in the foreign press, essentially to counter foreign propaganda.

===== Archive =====
Von Scheliha secretly began making a collection of documents on the atrocities of the Gestapo in 1939, particularly on the murders of Jews in Poland, which also contained photographs of the newly established extermination camps. In June 1941, he showed the dossier to a Polish intelligence agent, Countess Klementyna Mankowska, who was a member of the anti-Nazi group the Musketeers for which she worked as a courier. Mankowska visited him at the Foreign Office in Berlin to make the details known to the Polish resistance and to the Allies. Mankowska wrote that she was led into a large well-furnished room and that Von Scheliha presented a large thick folder, which described the gassing of Jews and other people. The last of the archive documents were written in January 1942 and passed to Polish resistance in February 1942. The fact that he stopped adding to the archive at that point is an indication that that it became too dangerous.

===== Protests =====
In August 1941, Von Scheliha learned of the murder of Polish mathematician and former Prime Minister of Poland Kazimierz Bartel on 27 August 1941 from Reuters. He immediately protested to the Reich Security Main Office and requested further information from Gerhard Kegel, (Note: Gerhard Kegel, a commercial specialist and Soviet GRU agent, was an associate of Rudolf Herrnstadt and had worked in the German embassy in Warsaw from 1935 to 1939.) who worked as a trade envoy in trade policy department in Moscow. The murder spurred Von Scheliha to make a list of 22 Polish intellectuals that he wanted to place under police protection to ensure their protection. Von Scheliha wanted to save them and to stop enemy propaganda from reporting they had been killed. He hoped to recruit them as allies so they would report abroad on Nazi atrocities in Poland and at the same act as mouthpieces for German propaganda, in effect making them indispensable to the Nazi state. Amongst those on the list was the art historian Mieczysław Gębarowicz, the librarian and historian Edward Kuntze (librarian), the bibliologist and philosopher Aleksander Birkenmajer, Bishop Andrey Sheptytsky, historian of economics Franciszek Bujak and paediatrician Franz Groër. Von Scheliha added Countess Irene Poninski, the wife of Count Konstantin Bninski after the family fled to Lemberg in 1940. Von Scheliha submitted the list to the Reich Security Main Office (RSHA) on 7 October 1941 with the assurance that all the folk on the list were willing to describe Soviet atrocities to aid in the formation of German propaganda, thereby keeping them alive. However, from the perspective of the Polish resistance, Von Scheliha who can be attributed to the resistance "may have gone the furthest ... but was largely an anonymous helper, even if his existence was known".

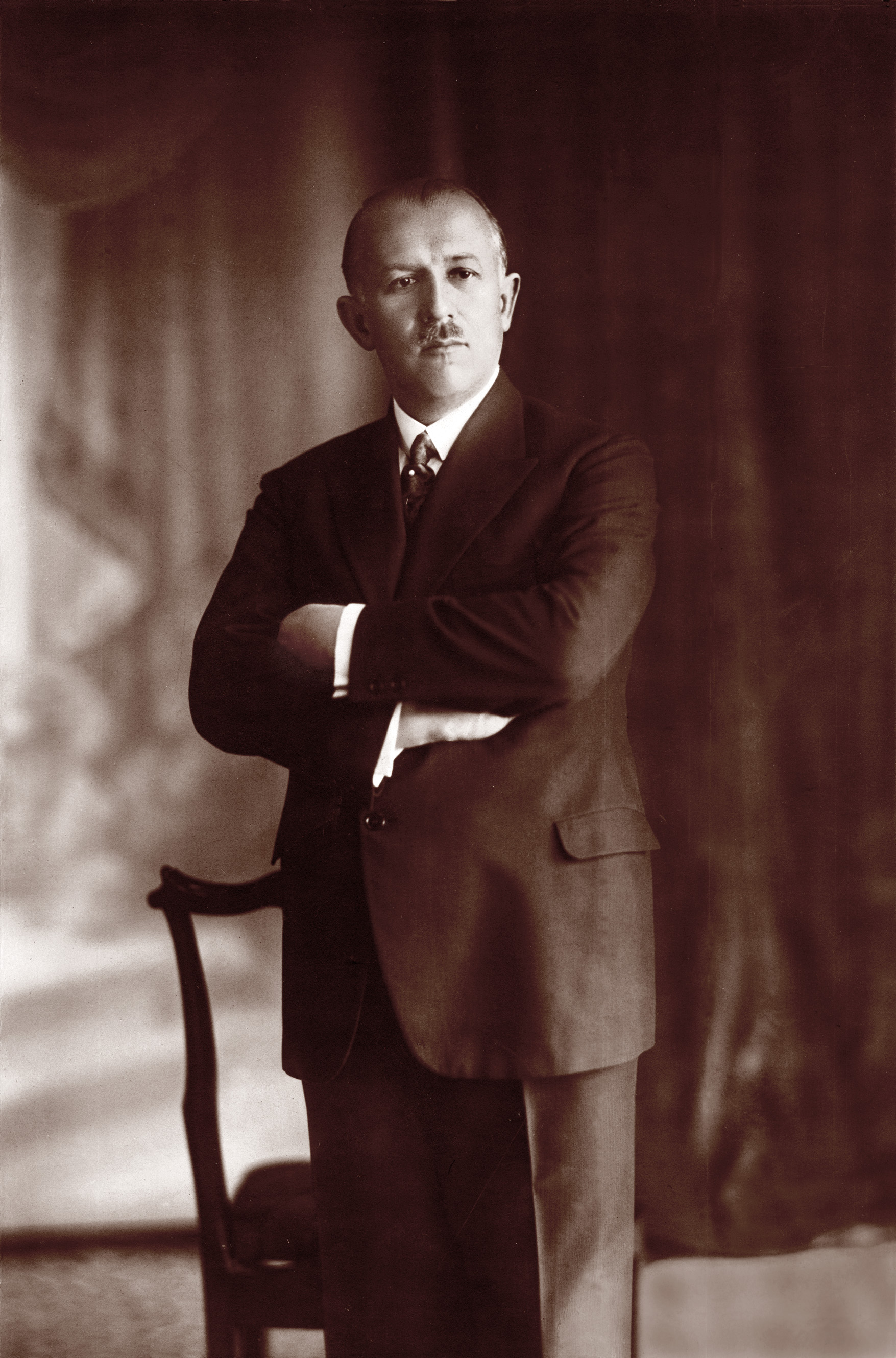
The murder of Kazimierz Bartel, led von Scheliha to try and save other members of the intelligensia.

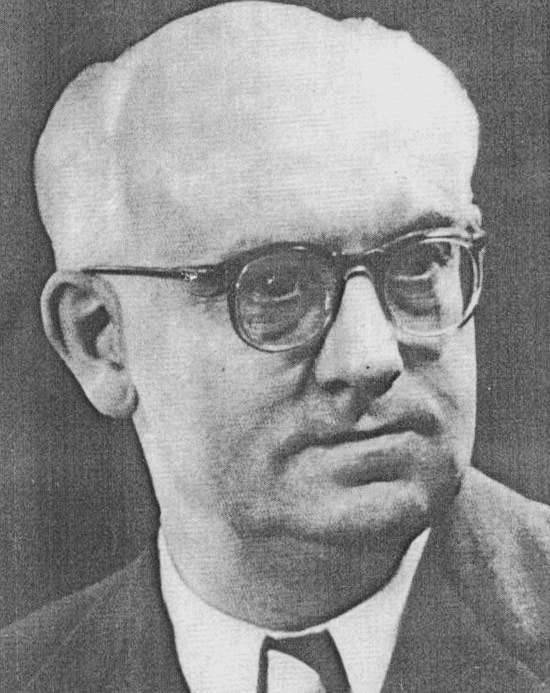
The commercial specialist Gerhard Kegel was an associate of Rudolf Herrnstadt

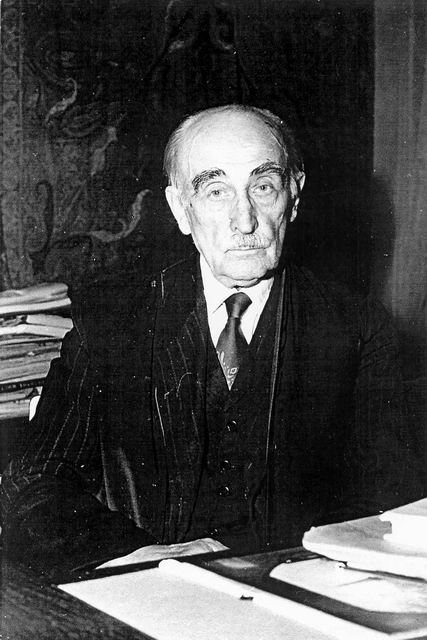
The art historian Mieczyslaw Gebarowicz

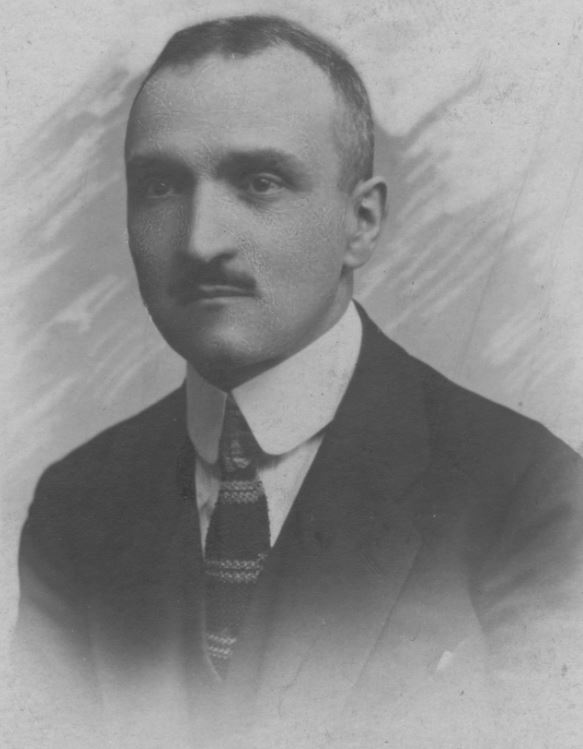
Kuntze, the prewar director of the library of the Jagiellonian University

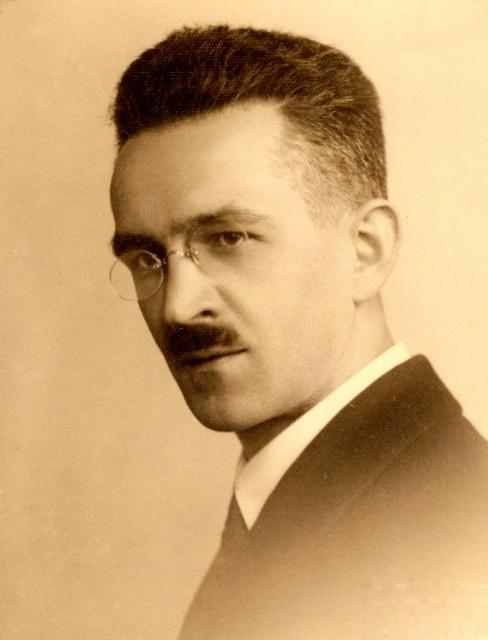
The bibliologist and philosopher Aleksander Birkenmajer was arrested as part of Sonderaktion Krakau.

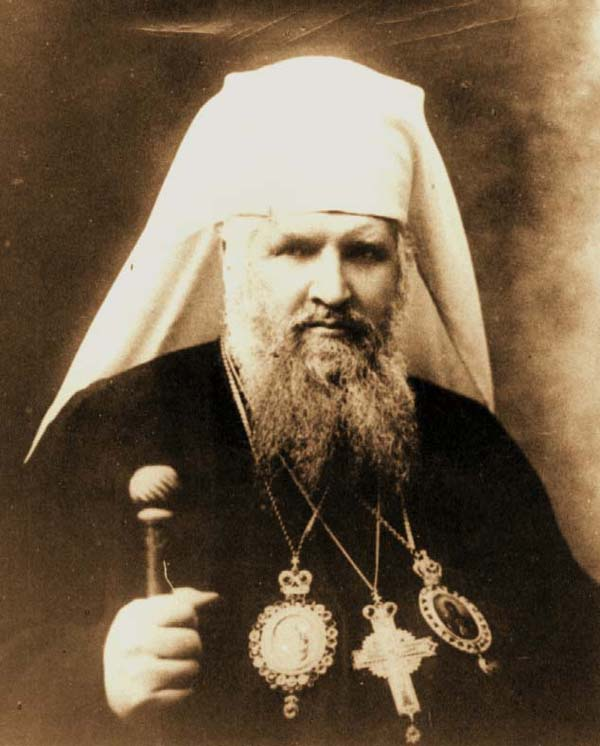
Bishop Andrey Sheptytsky protested to Himmler about the Holocaust in Ukraine

==== The Nazi Culture in Poland ====
The German academic Susanne Kienlechner believes that von Scheliha along with his colleague, the diplomat, Johann von Wühlisch (1889–1943) were involved in the development of The Nazi Culture in Poland book. The document, whose writers are not fully known, is considered one of the most detailed contemporary accounts of the early Holocaust as well as "Operation Tannenberg" and the Intelligenzaktion in Poland between 1939 and 1942. It describes the persecution of the church, the school and the university system; the dark role of the Institute of German Ostarbeiter as the driver of cultural rescheduling; the relocation and the sacking of libraries; the devastation of monuments; the looting of archives, museums and the private collections of the Polish nobility; the subversion of Polish theatre, music and press; and the forcible destruction of other cultural institutions by the Nazi Party. The document was completed in January 1942 and then recorded onto microfilm and smuggled to Britain at a high personal risk to those involved.

Kienlechner's evidence for von Scheliha's involvement rests with the quality and precision of the information contained in the document. Kienlechner believes the precise dating of historical facts, the correct names of the Nazis involved and their victims, the details of the theft and destruction of cultural assets and the correct interpretation of Nazi occupation policy in Poland, along with photographs and Nazi newspaper cuttings points to von Scheliha and Johann von Wühlisch as one source for the 200,000 word document.

In autumn 1941, Von Scheliha invited his Polish friend, Count Konstantin Bninski, to Berlin under the pretext of writing propaganda texts for the Foreign Office against the Polish resistance. The German diplomat and historian Ulrich Sahm considered it probable in his 1990 biography that von Scheliha passed material to Bninski in Warsaw that contained a comprehensive documentation of crimes during the German occupation. Kienlechner believes that Bninski then brought that material to Berlin to write The Nazi Culture in Poland for the Polish government-in-exile, who in turn published the document as a novel from 1944 to 1945.

==== Swiss warnings ====
In February 1942, von Scheliha ended his attempts to name and send out exiled Poles as helpers for German propaganda to stop endangering them and himself. At the same time, he closed the small Polish research department in the foreign office for fear of its members' lives. He began to despair and realised his powerlessness. That spring, he travelled to Switzerland, where his sister lived and provided Swiss diplomats with information on Aktion T4, including sermons by Bishop Clemens August Graf von Galen on the murders of the mentally ill. He also sent reports on the Final Solution, including the construction and the operation of more extermination camps, and on Hitler's order to exterminate European Jews.

Von Scheliha made further trips to Switzerland in September and October 1942. On his final trip he warned Carl Jacob Burckhardt of the International Committee of the Red Cross about the Final Solution. Burckhardt in turn informed the American consul in Geneva which was the first news of the Nazi extermination camps reaching the allies.

==== No contact ====
Shortly after the German invasion of the Soviet Union on 22 June 1941, the Soviet embassy in Berlin ceased operation and its legation expelled. At that point Soviet intelligence lost the connection with Stöbe. At the end of August 1941, Soviet intelligence sent GRU agent Anatoly Gurevich to Berlin to reestablish contact with Stöbe, but couldn't locate her. In May 1942, Bernhard Bästlein assisted Erna Eifler and Wilhelm Fellendorf who were Soviet agents who had parachuted into Germany in May 1942 with wireless telegraphy sets and been instructed to find Ilse Stöbe to re-establish communications. Eifler failed to contact Stöbe, who was then in Dresden. Eifler was arrested on 15 October and Fellendorf a short while later. Another Soviet agent, Heinrich Koenen, was dropped on 23 October in a third attempt to find Stöbe. Koenen was on a mission to pass all material that had been collected by Stöbe from von Scheliha, but he was arrested in Berlin on 26 October 1942.

Shortly after von Scheliha had returned from Switzerland, Stöbe was arrested on 12 September, followed by von Scheliha on 29 October in the office of the Foreign Office's personnel director.

== Arrest and death ==
He was charged by the Second Senate of the Reichskriegsgericht (Reich Military Court) and falsely charged to have been a member of the Red Orchestra and sentenced to death on 14 December 1942 for "treason for money" (Landesverrat gegen Geld). At the trial conducted by Manfred Roeder, von Scheliha was described as a bon vivant whose need for money brought him into the sphere of Soviet intelligence resulting in him eventually becoming an informant, that led him to take considerable sums of money to betray German secrets. That statement is based on a 1954 affidavit written by Judge Alexander Kraell who was one of the presiding judges at von Scheliha's secret trial. He also stated that political considerations played no part in the trial. The supposed evidence for von Scheliha's arrest was a payment slip found in the pocket of Heinrich Koenen. However, there was no evidence for connecting von Scheliha to the Red Orchestra, which was the supposed reason the death penalty. The indictment, Gestapo files, the court testimonies, the judgement and the reasons for the judgement have not been found, so it impossible to determine if the verdict was correct. Ulrich Sahm believes that von Scheliha was arrested and tried, so as to remove a politically dangerous anti-nazi, who by 1942 was seen as an enemy of the Nazi state.

In a written statement of 12 July 1952, judge and diplomat Herbert Schaffarczyk stated that von Scheliha was tortured by the Gestapo to obtain a confession and believed that he wasn't allowed a defence lawyer during trial. (Note: The German journalist and resistance fighter Carl Helfrich confirmed Schaffarczyk statement. Many people associated with the Red Orchestra, the group most associated with von Scheliha (incorrectly) were tortured to obtain confessions.) Another person who attended the trial was the Foreign Office legal representative Erich Albrecht (jurist). After the war, he informed the director of personnel at Foreign Office, Hans Schroeder (who wasn't allowed to attend), that he considered the sentence as effectively "judicial murder". At best, von Scheliha should have been subject to an internal disciplinary hearing at the Foreign Office as the only thing they could prove was a dalliance with Ilse Stöbe. Simply, there was no evidence for the death penalty sentence.

On 22 December 1942, he was executed by hanging in Plötzensee Prison.

His wife, Marie Louise, was arrested on 22 December 1942 and taken to the women's prison in Charlottenburg. There, she was repeatedly interrogated and threatened but released on 6 November 1943. In the last days of the war, she fled with her daughters to Niederstetten via Prague. In Haltenbergstetten Castle, the former castle of the principality of Hohenlohe-Jagstberg, the family lived in a cellar mainly on mushrooms, berries and fruit.

== Reappraisal ==
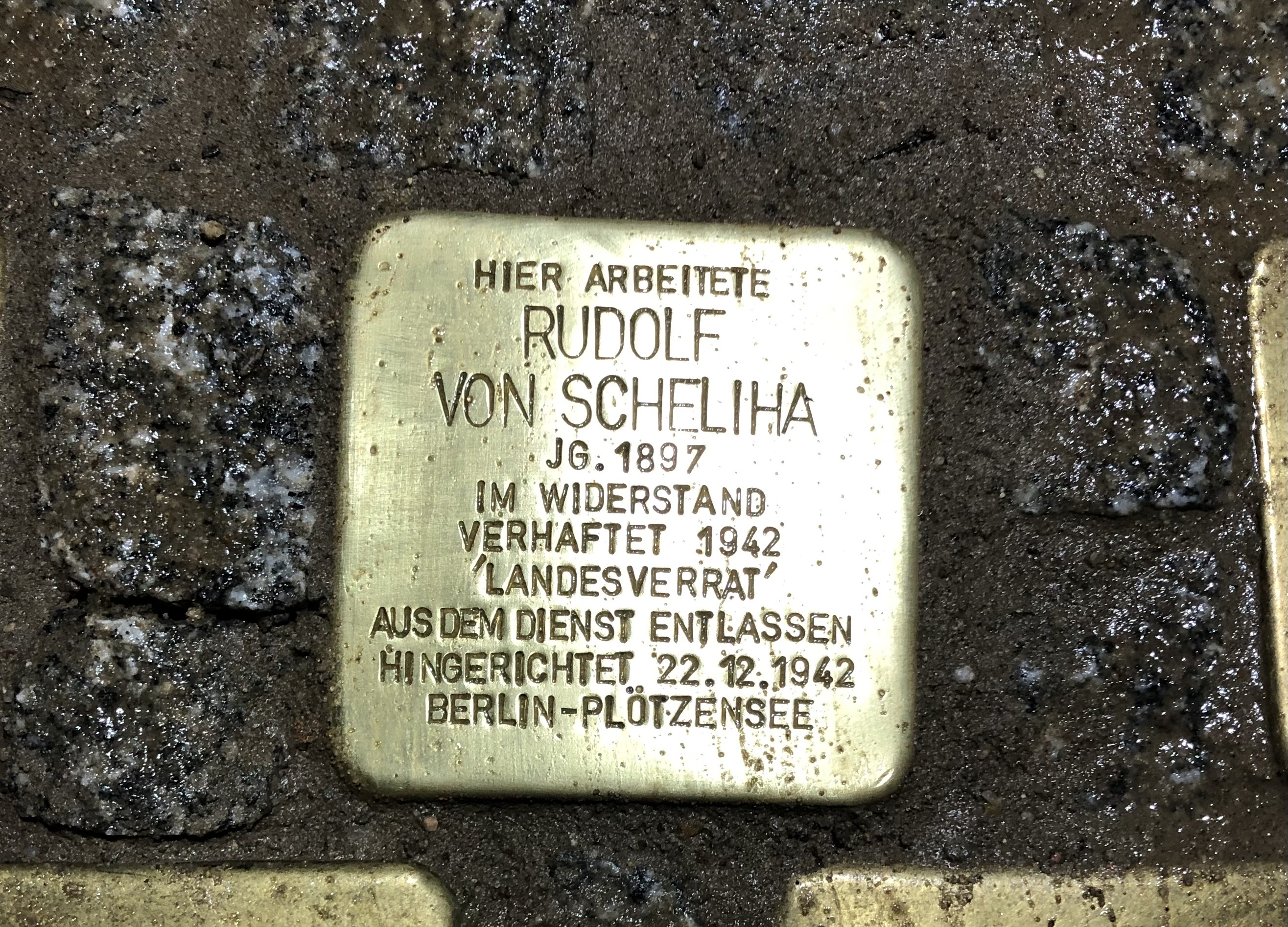
Stolperstein at Wilhelmstraße 92 in Mitte, Berlin, the former headquarters of the Federal Foreign Office

In West German historiography, in particular by the German historians Hans Rothfels, Peter Hoffman and the Dutch historian Ger van Roon, von Scheliha was not seen as a resistance fighter but as a spy for the Soviet services. In the process, the acts of interrogation and the Gestapo records continued to be uncritically classified as "sources" that were adopted by journalists and historians, to which former Nazi prosecutors such as Manfred Roeder and Alexander Kraell, the former president of the Second Senate of the Reichskriegsgericht, contributed after 1945.

== Reparations ==
In 1952, Von Scheliha's widow Marie Louise von Scheliha applied for compensation but was refused as her husband was not classified as a resistance fighter, but as a traitor. The Foreign Office adopted this attitude and for more than 50 years it refused to recognise Von Scheliha due to the findings of the 1942 Gestapo investigation. This was illustrated on 20 July 1961, when the Foreign Office in Bonn commemorated eleven of its employees, who were executed as resistance fighters, with a plaque, including Albrecht Graf von Bernstorff, Ulrich von Hassell, Adam von Trott zu Solz and Friedrich-Werner Graf von der Schulenburg. Von Scheliha was not mentioned because he continued to pass on information to the Soviet Union, which was considered a betrayal. In 1956, Marie Louise von Scheliha petitioned the West German president Theodor Heuss who granted her a "revocable maintenance contribution amounting to the legal widow's daily needs". The size of the contribution left her impoverished at the same time as widows of Nazis prosecutors had received full pension rights. In 1993, Von Scheliha made a request to the Württemberg State Office for a full pension benefits and was again refused as Rudolf von Scheliha has been subject to a "proper trial".

== Trial ==
From the mid-80's onwards, the retired diplomat Ulrich Sahm campaigned to rehabilitate von Scheliha. It wasn't until 1990, that he was rehabilitated in the eyes of historians with the publication of Sahm's meticulously researched book, "Rudolf von Scheliha 1897–1942. Ein deutscher Diplomat gegen Hitler" (Rudolf von Scheliha 1897-1942: A German diplomat against Hitler). Sahm reframes von Scheliha as a "daring and honourable resistance fighter". The release of the book was the likely basis for the 8th Chamber of Cologne Administrative Court (reference number 8K 5055/94), to rule on 25 October 1995 that Scheliha had been sentenced to death not for espionage but in a sham trial for his opposition to Nazism, which overturned the 1942 verdict and legally rehabilitated von Scheliha. The court ruled that von Scheliha has acted out of ideological motives, not for monetary reasons, i.e. "Scheliha had been persecuted because of his political opposition". According to witness statements and Sahm's historical research it was proved that von Scheliha did not even know that the information he had passed on to Ilse Stöbe and Rudolf Herrnstadt had been passed on to the Soviet Union. This proved that it was inconceivable that he committed "paid treason".

== Awards and honours ==
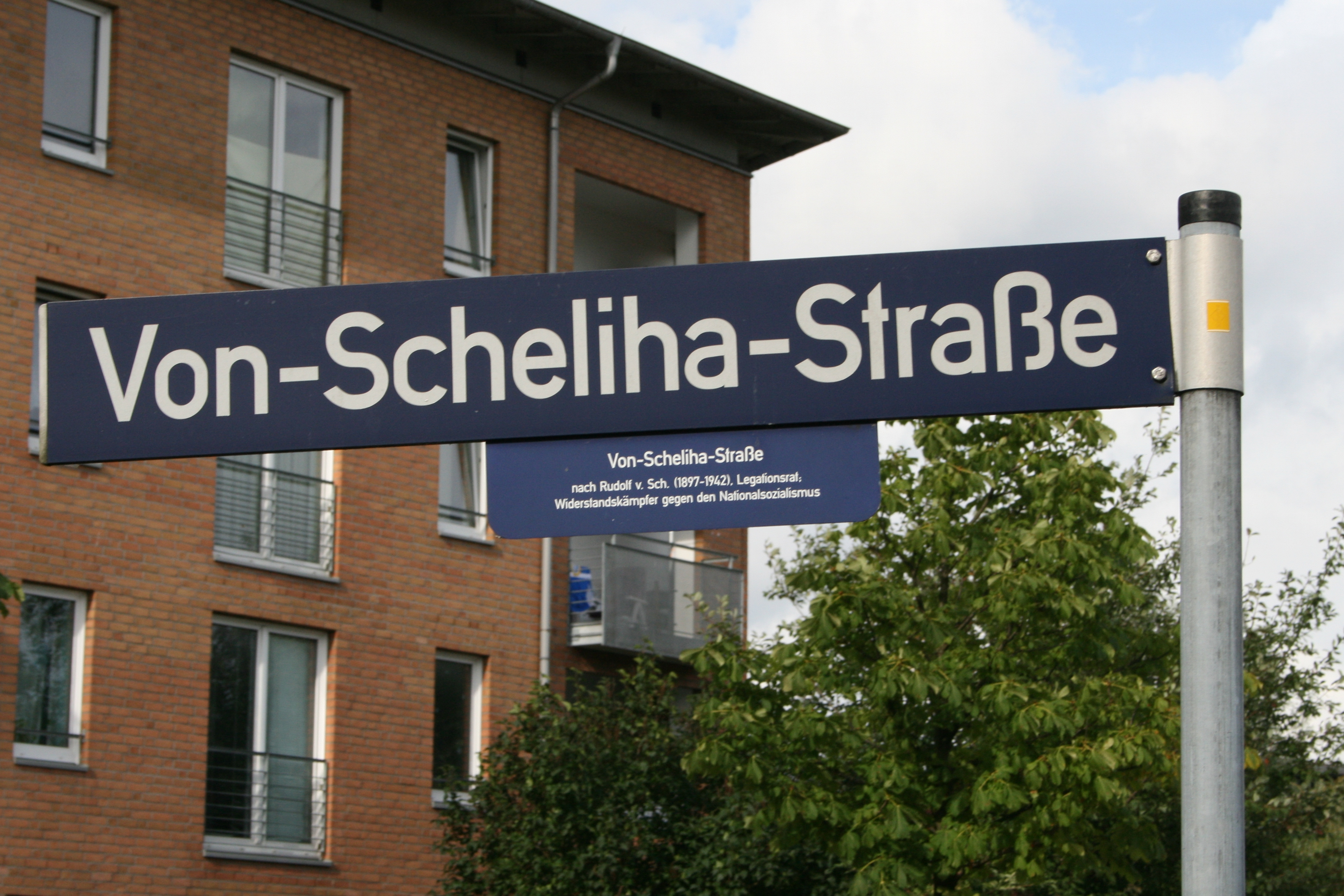
Von-Scheliha-Straße in Hamburg-Neuallermöhe

On 21 December 1995 at the Foreign Office, in a ceremony with State Secretary Hans-Friedrich von Ploetz, attached an additional board with the inscription "Rudolf von Scheliha 1897–1942". On 18 July 2000 in a ceremony at the new Foreign Office in Berlin, both boards were brought together and the names listed in the sequence of death dates. Von Scheliha's name leads the list. On 9 July 2014 Ilse Stöbe received the same honour at the Foreign Office.

== Odonymy ==
In Neuallermöhe, a street was named in memory of von Scheliha on 5 May 1997. There is a street in Gotha named Schelihastraße, but is named after the Oberhofmeister Ludwig Albert von Scheliha, who owned a large garden plot on the street on which the Protestant church stands today.

== See also ==
- Massacre of Lwów professors

== Bibliography ==
- Blasius, Rainer (29 July 2013). "Das Auswärtige Amt und Ilse Stöbe" (in German). Frankfurt: Fazit-Stiftung. Frankfurter Allgemeine Zeitung. Archived from the original on 22 July 2016.
- Borodziej, Włodzimierz (2014). "Die polnische Rezeption des deutschen Widerstands, 1944 – 2012" [The Polish reception of the German resistance, 1944 - 2012] (PDF). Evangelische Akademie zu Berlin gGmbH. Berlin: Einrichtung der Evangelischen Kirche Berlin-Brandenburg-schlesische Oberlausitz, Evangelischen Kirche in Deutschland.
- Brettin, Michael (15 January 2018). "Das waren die Kämpfer der 'Roten Kapelle'" [These were the fighters of the ‘Red Orchestra’] (in German). Berliner Verlag. Berliner Zeitung.
- Brysac, Shareen Blair (12 October 2000). Resisting Hitler: Mildred Harnack and the Red Orchestra: Mildred Harnack and the Red Orchestra. Oxford University Press, USA. ISBN 978-0-19-531353-6. OCLC 252663580.
- Coppi, Hans; Kebir, Sabine (2013). Ilse Stöbe : wieder im Amt : eine Widerstandskämpferin in der Wilhelmstrasse : eine Veröffentlichung der Rosa-Luxemburg-Stiftung [Ilse Stöbe: back in office: a resistance fighter in the Wilhelmstrasse: a publication of the Rosa Luxemburg Foundation] (in German). Hamburg: VSA. ISBN 978-3-89965-569-8. OCLC 856798644.
- Dörner, Bernward (2007). Die Deutschen und der Holocaust: was niemand wissen wollte, aber jeder wissen konnte (in German). Berlin: Propyläen. p. 281. ISBN 978-3-549-07315-5. OCLC 166214472.
- Eckelmann, Susanne (16 July 2015). "Rudolf von Scheliha 1897-1942". LEMO (in German). Berlin: Deutsches Historisches Museum.
- Eckelmann, Susanne (19 December 2018). "Rudolf von Scheliha 1897-1942". Deutsches Historisches Museum (in German). Berlin: Stiftung Deutsches Historisches Museum.
- Fikus, Sebastian (2018). "Zbrodniarz w gronostajach: Manfred Roeder" [The Criminal in Hermine: Manfred Roeder]. Studia Polityczne (in Polish) (4): 95–114.
- Fikus, Sebastian (2019). "Rudolf von Scheliha. Zapomniany bohater polsko-niemieckiej przyjaźni". Joseph von Eichendorff Konversatorium - Zeszyty Edukacji Kulturalnej - Hefte für Kulturbildung (in Polish). 81 (1). Opole: Konwersatorium im. Josepha von Eichendorffa: 17–45. ISSN 1232-5694.
- Frei, Norbert; Hayes, Peter (2011). "The German Foreign Office and the Past" (PDF). Bulletin of the German Historical Institute. 49. Washington, DC: 55–71.
- Geyken, Frauke (9 May 2014). Wir standen nicht abseits: Frauen im Widerstand gegen Hitler [We did not stand on the sidelines: women in the resistance against Hitler]. C.H.Beck. ISBN 978-3-406-65903-4.
- Grieder, Peter (1999). The East German leadership, 1946 - 1973: conflict and crisis (1st ed.). Manchester: Manchester University Press. ISBN 9780719054983. OCLC 59458638.
- Grosse, Heinrich (2005). "Ankläger von Widerstandskämpfern und Apologet des NS-Regimes nach 1945 – Kriegsgerichtsrat Manfred Roeder" [Prosecutor of resistance fighters and apologist for the Nazi regime after 1945 - court martial councillor Manfred Roeder]. Kritische Justiz (in German). 38 (1): 36–55. doi:10.5771/0023-4834-2005-1-36. ISSN 0023-4834. JSTOR 24240128.
- Gysi, Gregor (28 October 2011). "Drucksache 17/7488 17. Wahlperiode" (PDF). Deutscher Bundestag (in German). Berlin. Archived from the original (PDF) on 25 February 2024.
- Harmsen, Rieke C. (19 July 2018). "Frauen im Widerstand gegen den Nationalsozialismus" (in German). Munich: Evangelischer Presseverband für Bayern e.V. Sonntagsblatt. Archived from the original on 18 July 2024.
- Hürter, Johannes (2005). "Scheliha, Rudolf von". Neue Deutsche Biographie 22. Online version: Deutsche Biographie.
- Isphording, Bernd; Keiper, Gerhard; Kröger, Martin (21 May 2012). Biographisches Handbuch des deutschen Auswärtigen Dienstes, 1871-1945 [Biographical Handbook of the German Foreign Service, 1871-1945] (in German). Vol. 4. Paderborn: Ferdinand Schöningh. ISBN 978-3-506-71843-3.
- Kienlechner, Susanne (23 June 2007). "The Nazi Kultur in Poland. Rudolf von Scheliha und Johann von Wühlisch. Zwei Deutsche Diplomaten gegen die nationalsozialistische Kultur in Polen" [The Nazi culture in Poland Rudolf von Scheliha and Johann von Wühlisch. Two German diplomats against National Socialist culture in Poland] (PDF). Zukunft braucht Erinnerung (in German). Arbeitskreis Zukunft braucht Erinnerung.
- Kesaris, Paul. L, ed. (1979). The Rote Kapelle: the CIA's history of Soviet intelligence and espionage networks in Western Europe, 1936-1945. Washington DC: University Publications of America. ISBN 0-89093-203-4.
- Klemperer, Klemens Von (1994). German Resistance Against Hitler: The Search for Allies Abroad, 1938-1945. Ebsco Publishing. p. 68. ISBN 978-0-19-151334-3.
- Kühner, Claudia (19 December 2010). "Von den Nazis ermordet - und nach dem Krieg weiter verunglimpft" (in German). Zurich: Tamedia. Tages-Anzeiger.
- Liebmann, Irina (2008). Wäre es schön? Es wäre schön! mein Vater Rudolf Herrnstadt [Would it be nice? It would be nice! my father Rudolf Herrnstadt] (in German). Berlin: Berlin Verlag. ISBN 978-3827005892. OCLC 213434556.
- Mas, Dorothy A.; Harsch, Georg Felix (20 July 2020). Löw, Andrea; Pearce, Caroline (eds.). German Reich and Protectorate of Bohemia and Moravia September 1939–September 1941. Walter de Gruyter GmbH & Co KG. ISBN 978-3-11-052389-8. OCLC 1289822043.
- Matthews, Tony (2022). Spies, Saboteurs and Secret Missions of World War II. Newport, NSW: Big Sky Publishing. ISBN 978-1-922615-73-2.
- Roloff, Stefan (2004). Die Rote Kapelle: die Widerstandsgruppe im Dritten Reich und die Geschichte Helmut Roloffs [The Red Orchestra: the resistance group in the Third Reich and the story of Helmut Roloff] (in German) (1st ed.). Berlin: Ullstein. pp. 297–305. ISBN 9783548366692. OCLC 76625534.
- Rohkrämer, Martin (November 1991). "Rudolf von Scheliha, 1897-1942 by Ulrich Sahm - Review". Kirchliche Zeitgeschichte (in German). 2 (1). Vandenhoeck & Ruprecht (GmbH & Co. KG): 558–560.
- Sahm, Ulrich (1990). Rudolf von Scheliha, 1897-1942: ein deutscher Diplomat gegen Hitler [Rudolf von Scheliha, 1897-1942: a German diplomat against Hitler]. Munich: Beck. ISBN 3-406-34705-3.
- Scherstjanoi, Elke (2014). "Verräterin oder Patriotin? Ein Gutachten des Instituts für Zeitgeschichte" [Traitor or patriot? An expert opinion by the Institute of Contemporary History]. Vierteljahrshefte für Zeitgeschichte (in German). 62 (1). Munich: De Gruyter Oldenbourg (Deutschland): 139–156. doi:10.1515/vfzg-2014-0006. S2CID 199575964.
- Scherstjanoi, Elke (27 August 2013). "Ilse Stöbe (1911 - 1942) im Widerstand gegen das "Dritte Reich"" [Ilse Stöbe (1911 - 1942) in the resistance against the "Third Reich] (PDF). Institut für Zeitgeschichte. Munich: Leibniz Institute of Contemporary History.
- Schulte, Jan Erik; Wala, Michael (2013). Widerstand und Auswärtiges Amt: Diplomaten gegen Hitler (in German). Berlin: Siedler. ISBN 978-3-641-10494-8.
- Steinmeier, Frank-Walter (10 July 2014). "Speech by Foreign Minister Steinmeier at the ceremony in honour of Ilse Stöbe at the Federal Foreign Office on 10 July 2014". Federal Foreign Office.
- Tuchel, Johannes (1988). "Weltanschauliche Motivationen in Der Harnack/Schulze-Boysen-Organisation: (Rote Kapelle)". Kirchliche Zeitgeschichte (in German). 1 (2): 267–292. JSTOR 43750615.
- Tuchel, Johannes (2018). "Kommunalpolitik mit NSVergangenheit? Manfred Roeder als Beigeordneter in Glashütten" [Local politics with a Nazi past? Manfred Roeder as alderman in Glashütten] (PDF). Jahrbuch Hochtaunuskreis (in German). 26: 205.
- Tuchel, Johannes (1992). "Die Gestapo-Sonderkommision Rote Kapelle". In Coppi Jr., Hans; Danyel, Jürgen; Tuchel, Johannes (eds.). Die Rote Kapelle im Widerstand gegen Nationalsozialismus [The Red Orchestra in opposition to Hitler. Writings of the Memorial of the German Resistance, The Gestapo special commission Red Orchestra] (in German) (1st ed.). Berlin: Gedenkstätte Deutscher Widerstand. ISBN 978-3-89468-110-4.
- Ueberschär, Gerd R. (2006). Für ein anderes Deutschland: der deutsche Widerstand gegen den NS-Staat 1933-1945 [For another Germany: The German resistance against the Nazi state in 1933-1945] (in German) (Originalausg ed.). Frankfurt: Fischer Taschenbuch Verlag. p. 139. ISBN 3-596-13934-1.
- Vesper, Karlen (6 November 2010). "Die Mitwisser und Mittäter – und die Anderen" (in German). Berlin: nd.Genossenschaft eG. Neues Deutschland. Archived from the original on 25 September 2023.
- Wiaderny, Bernard (2002). Der polnische Untergrundstaat und der deutsche Widerstand: 1939-1944 [The Polish Underground State and the German Resistance: 1939-1944] (in German) (1st ed.). Berlin: VWF. pp. 86–91. ISBN 9783897003484. OCLC 50966170.
- Wippermann, Wolfgang (8 August 2013). "Als Spion geächtet" (in German). Jakob Augstein. Der Freitag. Archived from the original on 3 August 2023.
- Zitelmann, Rainer (1992). "Book reviews - ULRICH SAHM, Rudolf von Scheliha 1897-1942. A German diplomat against Hitler. Munich, Beck 1990. 400 pages, 48 DM" (PDF). Historische Zeitschrift (in German). 254. Berlin: Oldenbourg: 780–781. ISSN 0018-2613.
- "Zessel, Rudolf von Scheliha". Spectrum.direct (in Polish). Opole, Poland: Joseph-von-Eichendorff-Konversatorium, Ministerstwa Spraw Wewnętrznych i Administracji. 16 September 2024.
