= Renata von Scheliha =

German classical philologist

- Born: 16 August 1901
- Died: 4 November 1967 (aged 66)
- Occupations: Classical philologist, librarian, writer
- Awards: Guggenheim Fellowship

Renata Johanna von Scheliha (16 August 1901 – 4 November 1967) was a German classical philologist. She authored a number of books, treatises and monographs and carried out several translations.

== Life ==
Scheliha was born in Zessel, Oels, Silesia (now Cieśle, Gmina Oleśnica, Poland), as the daughter of Prussian aristocrat and officer Rudolph von Scheliha. Her mother was a daughter of the Prussian Minister of Finance Johann von Miquel. Her older brother by four years was the diplomat and resistance fighter Rudolf von Scheliha who was executed in December 1942 by the Nazis on a charge of being a member of the Red Orchestra.

Scheliha was educated by private tutors and in 1925 passed her Abitur as an external student at the Matthias Gymnasium in Wrocław. She then studied Sanskrit at the Ludwig-Maximilians-Universität München, where she became interested in the poet Stefan George who was introduced to her by Maria Fehling, the daughter of the mayor of Lübeck, Emil Ferdinand Fehling. As a result of this meeting, after her first two years of study, she decided to focus on classics. She changed subjects to Ancient History, Greek and Latin, with Sanskrit as a minor subject.

In 1928, during a visit to Prague with her brother, she was introduced to the poet Johannes Urzidil, who later remarked of her: a slender, pale girl, shy and silent, a student of philosophy and especially devoted to ancient literature. But she also writes her own verses. In 1931 she was awarded the title of PhD in classics at the University of Breslau with a thesis called The water boundary in ancient times (Die Wassergrenze im Altertum), studying water borders in Egypt, Greece and the countries of the Roman Empire. Her thesis advisor was Conrad Cichorius.

== Career ==
In 1931, von Scheliha was employed to catalogue the Sanskrit library at the University of Breslau. Later that year she moved to Berlin. Between 1931 and 1939 she earned a meagre livelihood working as a tour guide and lecturer in museums as well as offering evening courses at Lessing-Hochschule zu Berlin, an adult education institution. Through the jurist, poet and historian Berthold Vallentin, she came into contact with the discussion group around Stefan George and befriended the philosopher Edith Landmann and the writer Ernst Morwitz, among others. She also got to know the writer and journalist Wolfgang Frommel, who describes her: At our first meeting I was affected by this slender figure, from her dark brown hair like a face framed by wings, the big black blue eyes, the first almost frighteningly dark voice.

In 1933, von Scheliha gave up her intention to habilitate at Goethe University Frankfurt (under Karl Ludwig Reinhardt) after the seizure of power by the Nazis, to which she was opposed. In 1934, her second book, on Dion of Syracuse was published. In this, she referred to Dion's position at the court of his predecessors in Syracuse, his triumph, doom and glory. She emphasized the state importance of Platonic philosophy and declared: Only from the creative forces of the spirit was to re-establish state order. Over the next four years, von Scheliha worked on a translation of On the Sublime, which was published in 1938.

Due to the worsening of the political situation, she accepted Edith Landmann's invitation to move to Basel in August 1939, where she would spend 5 years with her close friend Landmann and their common friend, the art historian and poet Gertrud Kantorowicz. Her residence permit required enrolment at the local university. The German economist Edgar Salin found her a place at the University of Basel. Two years later she completed a translation of Euripides' Heracles. For this she received the Julius Landmann Prize from the University of Basel. From June 1942, she supported Edith Landmann in working on a book, Stefan George und die Griechen : Idee einer neuen Ethik.

In 1943, von Scheliha's book Patroklos: Gedanken über Homers Dichtung und Gestalten was published. The German Jewish poet Karl Wolfskehl called it the most vivid, endearing, most tense and almost maternally cleverest book about Homer and the first world of Greekism. In fact, in the 418-page book, she not only addressed the title character, but also developed Thoughts on Homer's Poetry and Figures according to the subtitle. Von Scheliha objected to the dismembered method of recent research, which had lost the understanding of all the essentials of a poem, had suffocated every effect of the poet, and wanted instead to find the being of the poet. For her, Homeric poetry makes clear the uniform composition and the human formation of the figures. In the dispute over whether Iliad and Odyssey are the work of a poet or composed of several epics of different authors, she therefore defended the first thesis by referring to the purification of the older saga by Homer, the setting of the Homeric world, Homer's art and the figures invented by Homer, such as Patroklos. While her thesis that Homer lived in the 11th century BC was problematic, her interpretation of Homer as an educator on humanity and the emphasis on the high ethos of his figures included an indirect critique of Nazism and its followers.

During the years Von Scheliha was working at the University of Basel, she gave a series of non-university lectures on ancient topics, some of which were published posthumously. She lectured about Ancient Humanity (May 1944), political and intellectual freedom, education and friendship among the Greeks (Winter 1944–1945), The image of antiquity from the Renaissance to the present (spring 1945), Pindar's life, his XIV. Olympic and I. Pythian Ode, Sophocles' play Philoctetes (winter 1945–1946), the comedies of Aristophanes (winter 1946–1947) and the Oresteia of Aeschylus (April–May 1948).

Most importantly, von Scheliha prepared a treatise on a rarely discussed topic; the competitions of poets in Ancient Greece in the period from about 700 to 200 BC. BC, in which rhapsodes, comedy and tragedy deniers participated. In June 1948, she moved to the United States and was appointed to a position at the School of Library Service at Columbia University. During that period she continued working on the treatise. In order to secure her livelihood and to be able to work, she trained as a librarian, undertaking an MS in Library Science. Between 1949 and 1951, she worked as a cataloguer in the Bryn Mawr College library in Pennsylvania. The following year, von Scheliha was appointed as a cataloguer at the History of Medicine Division of the Armed Forces Medical Library in Cleveland, Ohio and held the position until 1954. This work, together with the effects of lifelong deprivation on her health, meant that she did not finish the treatise; it was published in part after her death.

In 1957, von Scheliha became a fellow of the John Simon Guggenheim Memorial Foundation in Manhattan. She remained in New York City until her death in 1967.

== Bibliography ==
=== Monographs ===
- von Scheliha, Renata (1931). Die Wassergrenze im Altertum [The water boundary in antiquity]. Historische Untersuchungen, 8 (in German). Breslau: Marcus. OCLC 906613688.
- von Scheliha, Renata (1934). Dion: die platonische Staatsgründung in Sizilien [Dion : the Platonic foundation of the state in Sicily]. Erbe der Alten (in German). Vol. 2. Dieterich: Dieterich. OCLC 7636486.
- von Scheliha, Renata (1943). Patroklos Gedanken über Homers Dichtung und Gestalten [Patroklo's Thoughts on Homer's Poetry and Shapes] (in German). Basel: Benno Scwabe & Co. OCLC 1081721203.
- Von Scheliha, Renata (1987). Vom Wettkampf der Dichter: der musische Agon bei den griechen. Hefte von Castrum Peregrini (in German). Vol. 177–178 (2nd ed.). Amsterdam: Castrum Peregrini. ISBN 978-90-6034-061-5. OCLC 799770583.

=== Lectures ===
- von Scheliha, Renata (1968). Freiheit und Freundschaft in Hellas Sechs Basler Vorträge. Castrum Peregrini (in German). Vol. 82–83. Amsterdam: Castrum Peregrini Presse. OCLC 564338982.
- von Scheliha, Renata (1970). Der Philoktet des Sophokles; ein Beitrag zur Interpretation des griechischen Ethos. Castrum Peregrini (in German). Vol. 93–94. Amsterdam: Castrum Peregrini Presse. OCLC 830332.
- von Scheliha, Renata (1975). Die Komödien des Aristophanes: in sieben Vorträgen interpretiert (in German). Amsterdam: Castrum Peregrini Presse. ISBN 978-90-6034-029-5. OCLC 461932537.

=== Translations ===
- Longinus (1970). Die Schrift vom Erhabenen: dem Longinus zugeschrieben; griechisch und deutsch (in German). Translated by von Scheliha, Renata. Düsseldorf: Küpper. ISBN 978-3-7835-0010-3. OCLC 310696795.
- Euripides - Herakles (in German). Vol. 219–220. Translated by von Scheliha, Renata. Amsterdam: Castrum Peregrini. 1995.

=== Correspondence ===
- Blasberg, Cornelia, ed. (1988). "Briefe Renata von Schelihas an Karl Wolfskehl". Karl Wolfskehls Briefwechsel aus Neuseeland 1938–1948 (in German). Luchterhand: Edition Hentrich. pp. 818–843. ISBN 3-89468-110-1.
- Frommel, Wolfgang; Scheliha, Renata von; Bock, Claus V; Goldschmidt, Manuel R (2002). Wolfgang Frommel, Renate von Scheliha: Briefwechsel 1930-1967 (in German). Vol. 251–252. Amsterdam: Castrum Peregrini Presse. OCLC 905442120.

=== Reviews ===
- Combellack, Frederick M. (1952). "Reviewed Work: Patroklos. Gedanken uber Homers Dichtung und Gestalten by Renata von Scheliha". The American Journal of Philology. 73 (1). The Johns Hopkins University Press: 87–92. doi:10.2307/292239. JSTOR 292239.
- Knight, W. F. J. (January 1948). "Patroklos. By Renata von Scheliha. Basel, Benno Schwabe & Co. Verlag, 1943. Pp. 1–418. Cloth, large 8vo. With frontispiece. Fr. 20 (Swiss)". Greece and Rome. 17 (49). Cambridge University Press: 41–42. doi:10.1017/S0017383500009840.
