= Aleksander Šeliga =

Slovenian footballer (born 1980)

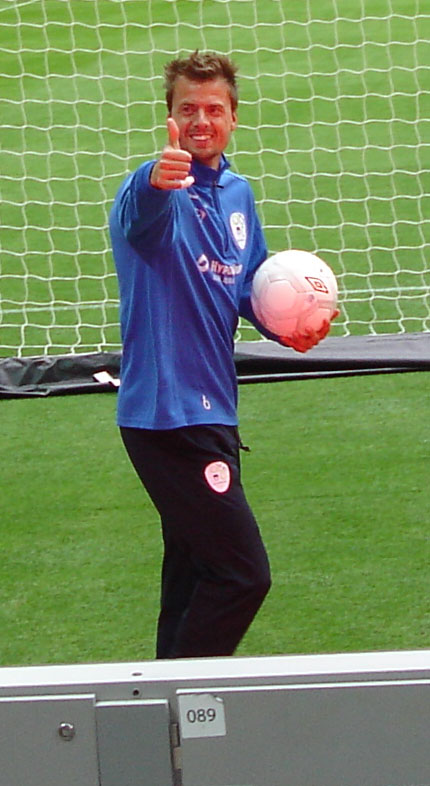
- Šeliga with Slovenia in 2009

Personal information
- Date of birth: 1 February 1980 (age 46)
- Place of birth: Celje, SFR Yugoslavia
- Height: 1.86 m (6 ft 1 in)
- Position: Goalkeeper

Youth career
- Kovinar Štore
- Drava Ptuj

Senior career*
| Years | Team | Apps | (Gls) |
| 1997–2005 | Celje | 121 | (0) |
| 2005–2006 | Slavia Prague | 2 | (0) |
| 2006–2009 | Celje | 68 | (0) |
| 2009–2011 | Sparta Rotterdam | 32 | (0) |
| 2011–2018 | Olimpija Ljubljana | 96 | (0) |
| 2018 | → Drava Ptuj (loan) | 13 | (0) |
| 2018 | Drava Ptuj | 17 | (0) |

International career
| 1997 | Slovenia U17 | 1 | (0) |
| 1997–1998 | Slovenia U18 | 10 | (0) |
| 2000 | Slovenia U20 | 3 | (0) |
| 2000 | Slovenia U21 | 1 | (0) |
| 2010 | Slovenia | 1 | (0) |
- * Club domestic league appearances and goals

Aleksander Šeliga (born 1 February 1980) is a Slovenian retired footballer who played as a goalkeeper.

== Club career ==
=== Early career ===
Šeliga played most of his career for hometown club Celje in the Slovenian PrvaLiga. With this club, he also participated in the UEFA Cup. In 2005, he joined Slavia Prague, but after an unsuccessful period with the Czech side, he returned to Celje.

=== Sparta Rotterdam ===
In the summer of 2009, Šeliga was tested by two clubs in the Netherlands. The first club, SC Heerenveen, was in desperate need for a keeper. After training with the side, he did not get a contract. The second club where he tried his luck was Sparta Rotterdam. The club also needed a keeper, after Cássio Ramos returned to PSV Eindhoven after an ended loan-period. After a brief internship, Šeliga signed a contract for two years. In his first season with Sparta (2009–10), he was chosen as first keeper by a manager Frans Adelaar.

== International career ==
Šeliga earned his only appearance for the senior Slovenian national team on 3 March 2010, after taking the field as a substitute in an international friendly against Qatar in Maribor, which Slovenia had subsequently won 4–1.

== Honours ==
Celje

- Slovenian Cup: 2004–05

Olimpija

- Slovenian Championship: 2015–16
