= Sonderkommando Rote Kapelle =

Nazi counter-espionage outfit in WW2

Sonderkommando Rote Kapelle was a German special commission that was created by German High Command in November 1942, in response to the capture of two leading members of a Soviet espionage group that operated in Europe, that was called the Red Orchestra (German: Rote Kapelle) by the Abwehr. The Sonderkommando Rote Kapelle was an internal counter-intelligence operation run by the Abwehr and the Gestapo. It consisted of a small independent Gestapo unit that was commanded by SS-Obersturmbannführer Friedrich Panzinger and its chief investigator was Gestapo officer Karl Giering. Its remit was to discover and arrest members of the Red Orchestra in Germany, Belgium, France, Netherlands, Switzerland and Italy during World War II.

== Archival history ==
While some documents on the "Rote Kapelle Special Commission" are available, others for example, from the Military Historical Archives in Prague and Moscow have not been examined. At the same time, none of the former Gestapo or Abwehr personnel made reports after the war, for obvious reasons. This means that the history of the Sonderkommando Rote Kapelle is only partially complete.

== Name ==
The name Rote Kapelle was a cryptonym that was used by the Reich Security Main Office (RSHA), the security and counter-espionage part of the Schutzstaffel (SS), which referred to resistance radio operators as "pianists", their transmitters as "pianos", and their supervisors as "conductors". The Rote Kapelle was a collective name that was used by the Gestapo, the German secret police, for the purpose of identification, and the Funkabwehr, the German radio counterintelligence organisation. The name of Kapelle was an accepted Abwehr term to denote secret radio transmitters and the counterintelligence operation against them.

== Size and location ==
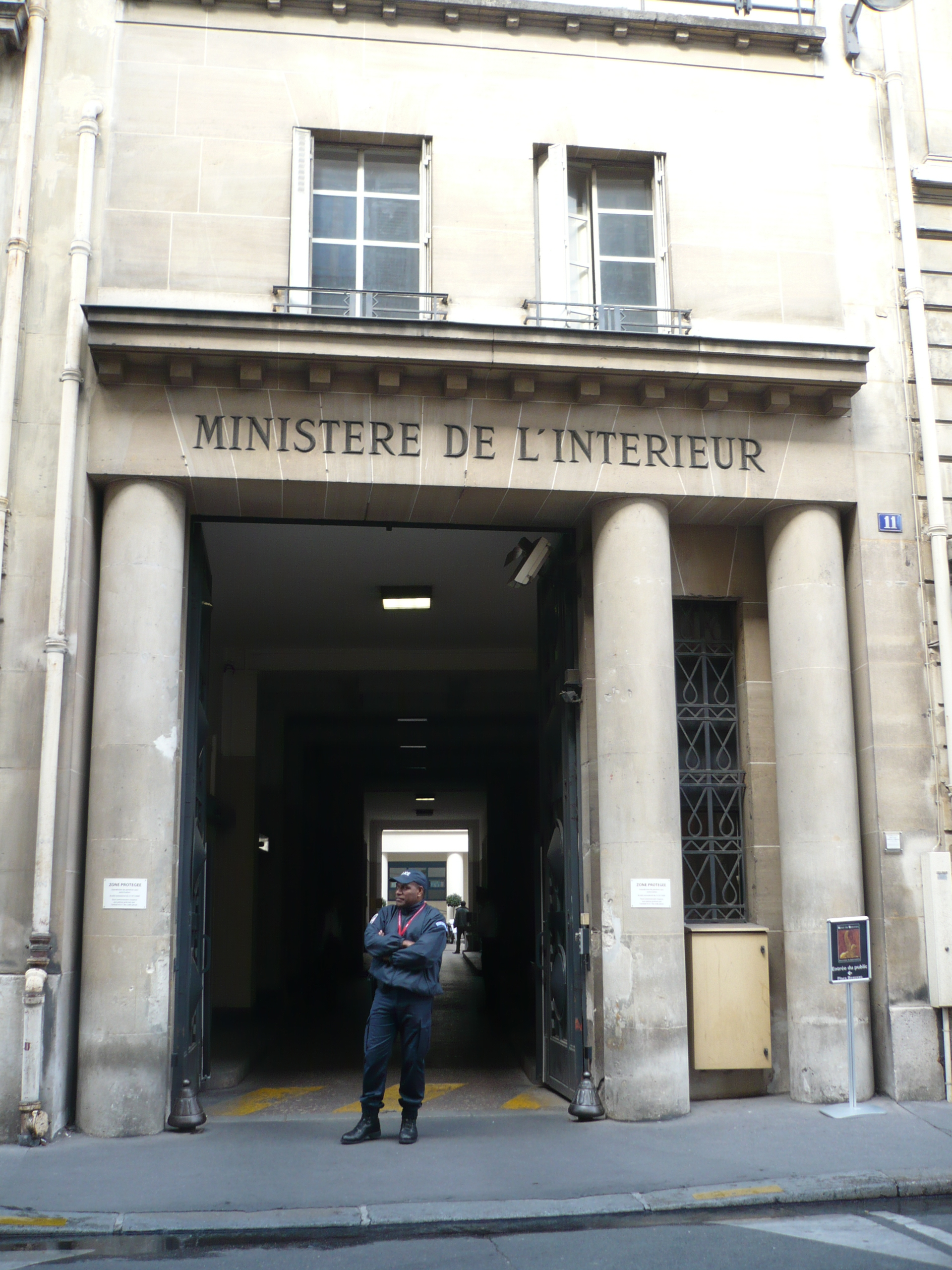
The Ministry of the Interior at 11 Rue des Saussaies, where the Sonderkommando offices were located

The Sonderkommando was a small organisation of around 12–15 investigators that included two typists. When it moved to Paris, it was located in the third floor in four rooms (335-339) of the French ministry of the interior at 11 Rue des Saussaies. As a unit, they did not outwardly present themselves as Gestapo officials. Instead, they wore suits and ties to work to enable them to operate clandestinely, with the demeanour of businessmen In August 1943, the Sonderkommando moved to the Boemelburg hotel at 40 Bd Victor-Hugo in Neuilly-sur-Seine in Paris. In March 1944, the unit moved to rooms at 63 Rue de Courcelles next to Avenue Hoche due to a disagreement between Heinz Pannwitz and the Security police and SD commander (BdS) Hans Henschke. It was also a matter of convenience as it was closer to where the staff were headquartered.

== Formation ==
On 26 June 1941, a radio transmission was intercepted by the Funkabwehr, the German radio counterintelligence organisation in Brussels. This was the first of many. In August 1941, when the Abwehr realised the nature of the signals, they created a counterintelligence operation with the name Rote Kapelle that was started by Abwehrstelle Belgium (Ast Belgium), a field office of Abwehr IIIF. In October–November 1941, Abwehr officer Henry Piepe was ordered to take charge of the investigation. Piepe became the liaison between the Sonderkommando and the Abwehr.

By September 1941, over 250 messages had been intercepted. On 30 November 1941, close range direction-finding teams moved into Brussels and as a result of Piepe's work, almost immediately found three transmitter signals. Piepe chose a location at 101 Rue des Atrébates, that provided the strongest signal. The house was raided by the Abwehr on 12 December 1941 where they found Soviet agent Anatoly Gurevich's transmitter and arrested radio operators Mikhail Makarov and his assistant Anton Danilov. On the 30 July 1942, the Funkabwehr identified a further house at 12 Rue de Namur, Brussels and raided it As well as arresting Soviet agent and radio specialist Johann Wenzel, two messages that were waiting to be enciphered were discovered in the house that contained details of such startling content, the plans for Case Blue, that Henry Piepe immediately drove to Berlin from Brussels to report to German High Command.

The start of the Sonderkommando Rote Kapelle cannot be precisely established. Walter Schellenberg, recorded details in his memoirs of an agreement that came about between Fritz Thiele, Wilhelm Canaris, Heinrich Müller and himself in the summer of 1942, to establish a "special commission" to investigate the problem. German counter-intelligence spent months assembling the data and finally Wilhelm Vauck, a cryptanalyst in the Abwehr succeeded in decrypting around 200 of the captured messages. On 15 July 1942, Vauck decrypted a message that was dated 10 October 1941. and addressed to Kent, (Anatoly Gurevich) that gave the addresses of several individuals of German nationality. This resulted in another meeting between Schellenberg, Thiele, Canaris and Müller where it was decided that the investigation should include Germany and that the Belgium and the Low Countries investigation would continue to be carried out jointly by the Gestapo and the Abwehr, while the German investigation would be carried out only by the Gestapo. In July 1942, the investigation was transferred from Ast Belgium to Section IV. A.2. of the Sicherheitsdienst. After the arrest of Leopold Trepper and Anatoly Gurevich, a small independent Gestapo unit, known as the "Sonderkommando Rote Kapelle" was established in Paris, France in November 1942. The unit was led by Friedrich Panzinger and the investigation was led by Heinrich Reiser. The Belgium investigation was conducted by Karl Giering of the Reich Security Main Office (RSHA) department AMT IV A 2. The Berlin unit was led by Horst Kopkow. When the Belgium investigation was completed, Giering moved to Paris to take over the investigation there.

The unit had to work in occupied French territory but not under the command of the BdS but instead was commanded by the RSHA.

== Processing ==
Gestapo interrogations followed a standard process. Prisoners were interrogated and tortured several times in the first few days and their confession recorded onto an auto recording device, for example the Lorenz Textophon. Several days or weeks later the prisoners would be visited by General Judge of the Luftwaffe Manfred Roeder who conducted a shorter, formal interrogation. The prisoner's final statement would then be recorded: "I stand by my statements to the Secret State Police. They correspond to the truth and I make them the subject of my judicial hearing today" The interrogation by Werner Krauss, Heinrich Scheel and Günther Weisenborn were the exception to the standard process as they largely dictated their confession. By the time of the interrogation phase, the Gestapo already knew many of people's names.

The torture and interrogation would often last a particularly long time, even to determine the smallest detail. For example, Wilhelm Guddorf was asked to provide details of three communists that he had met in Sachsenhausen concentration camp in November 1939, while he was imprisoned there. (Note: Guddorf's testimony led to the arrest of eighty-five people in the North Sea dockyards) His torture lasted from 15 October to 16 October at 4 a.m.

== Operations ==
=== Brussels ===
In Berlin, the Gestapo was ordered to assist Henry Piepe and they selected Giering, who took what reports Piepe had prepared and took over the investigation in Brussels Giering's investigation linked the name Carlos Alamos with GRU officer Mikhail Makarov, who had been arrested during the Rue des Atrébates raid. On Giering's instructions, Makarov was taken to Berlin to undergo interrogation. Instead of being sent to Breendonk or a concentration camp, he was taken to Giering's home, where Giering hoped the homely environment would make him talk. However, Makarov never exposed any details of the network and he was sent back to Saint-Gilles prison in Brussels.

Giering then turned to Rita Arnould as the new lead in the investigation and she identified the Polish-Jewish forger Abraham Rajchmann. Rajchmann was an informer to the Belgian Police Judiciaire des Parquets (Judiciary Police). It was Rajchmann who had been forging identity documents in the secret room of Rue des Atrébates. Rajchmann in turn betrayed Soviet agent Konstantin Jeffremov who was arrested on 22 July 1942 in Brussels in a sting operation, while attempting to obtain forged identity documents for himself to enable him to escape.

Jeffremov was to be tortured but immediately agreed to cooperate. As a collaborator, he exposed several important members of the espionage network in Belgium and the Netherlands. Eventually Jeffremovs commitment led him to work for the Sonderkommando in a funkspiel operation. Through Jeffremov, contact was made with the Belgian courier Germaine Schneider who carried intelligence between Brussels and Paris. However, Schneider contacted Leopold Trepper, the technical director of Soviet Red Army Intelligence in western Europe, to warn him. Trepper advised Schneider to sever all contact with Jeffremov and move to a hideout in Lyons. Giering instead focused on Germaine Schneider's husband Franz Schneider as the next lead. In November 1942, Franz Schneider was interrogated by Giering but he was released from protective custody as he wasn't part of the network. Schneider on his released contacted Trepper to inform him that Jeffremov was under arrest.

Rajchmann was arrested by Piepe on 2 September 1942 when his usefulness as an informer to the Abwehr was at an end. Rajchmann also decided to cooperate with the Abwehr resulting in his betrayal of his mistress, the Comintern member Malvina Gruber, who was arrested on 12 October 1942. Gruber immediately decided to cooperate with the Abwehr, in an attempt to avoid interrogation. She admitted the existence of Soviet agent Anatoly Gurevich and his probable location, as well as exposing several members of the Trepper espionage network in France.

==== Simexco ====
As part of the routine investigation, Harry Piepe discovered that the firm Simexco in Brussels was being used as a cover for Soviet espionage operations by the Trepper network. It was used as a means to generate monies that could be used in day-to-day operations by the espionage group unbeknownst to the employees of the company and at the same time provide travel documentation (Note: Known as the Ausweis, these were special versions of the Kennkarte, issued by a company that enabled European wide travel and crucially, allowed entry into German military sites.) and facilities for European wide telephone communication between group members. Piepe was concerned about the large number of telegrams the company was sending to Berlin, Prague and Paris and decided to investigate it. Piepe visited the Chief Commissariat Officer for Brussels, who was responsible for the company. In the meeting Piepe showed the two photographs that had been discovered at the house at 101 Rue des Atrébates, to the commanding officer who immediately identified the aliases of Leopold Trepper and Anatoly Gurevich. As part of a combined operation with Giering in Paris, Piepe raided the offices of Simexco on the 19 November 1942. When the Gestapo entered the Simexco office they found only one person, a clerk, but managed to discover all the names and addresses of Simexco employees and shareholders from company records. Over the month of November, most of the people associated with the company were arrested and taken to St. Gilles Prison in Brussels or Fort Breendonk in Mechelen.

=== Amsterdam ===
On 25 July 1942, the Dutch agent Maurice Peper was arrested by Piepe in Brussels. Between late 1940 and July 1942, Peper worked first for Gurevich and then Jeffremov as courier who operated between Johann Wenzel in Brussels and Anton Winterink in Amsterdam. He was betrayed by Jeffremov, who informed the Sonderkommando of a covert meeting, known as a treff that was to take place in a Brussels street by Peper and Hermann Isbutzki. Peper agreed to work for the Sonderkommando after being tortured and revealed that he was to meet Anton Winterink a few days later in Amsterdam. Piepe escorted Peper to Amsterdam who allowed Peper to attend the meeting. On 18 or 19 August 1942 (sources vary), Winterink was arrested by Piepe at the meeting in cafe in Amsterdam. A total of 17 people from Winterink's group were arrested and a radio transmitter was seized from Winterink's apartment. Winterink was taken to Brussels where he was tortured for two weeks before he agreed to work for the Sonderkommando. On 22 September 1942, Winterink began a funkspiel operation under the name "Beam Tanne.

Peper also betrayed Augustin Sésée, the reserve radio operator in the Jeffremov network, who was arrested in August 1942. Sésée was initially sent to Saint-Gilles prison in Brussels and then taken to Berlin where he was beheaded in January 1944. Peper was sent to Plötzensee Prison where he was executed on 28 July 1943.

=== Berlin ===
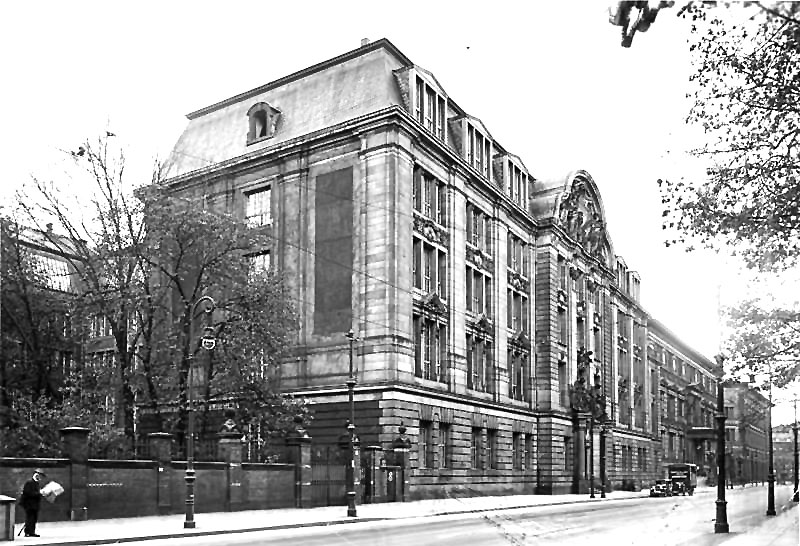
Gestapo HQ at 8 Prinz Albrecht Street

In Berlin, the Gestapo had been monitoring the movements and tapped the telephone calls of the couples, Harro and Libertas Schulze-Boysen as well as Greta and Adam Kuckhoff, along with Arvid and Mildred Harnack since July 1942. Horst Heilmann had phoned Harro Schulze-Boysen and Waldemar Lentz (Note: Lentz was a radio operator who had been assigned by the Referat 12 of the Funkabwehr to work with the Sonderkommando. He had gotten to know Harro Schulze-Boysen through Johannes Haas-Heye, the brother of Libertas Schulze-Boysen, while he was working in the Großdeutscher Rundfunk radio broadcaster. Lentz also knew Heilmann from his time working for Funkabwehr HQ, that was located at Matthäikirchplatz in Berlin. Lentz would eventually work in the Sonderkommando as a radio operator, beginning in September 1943. He was never a resistance fighter and was unconnected to the Red Orchestra. Indeed Lentz was a Nazi.) to warn them that they were likely being watched and this hastened the start of the Gestapo operation to arrest the group. Schulze-Boysen was the first of the Berlin group to the arrested on 31 August 1942. He was placed in "house arrest" (Hausgefängnis) and taken to Gestapo HQ at 8 Prinz Albrecht Street where he was interrogated by Kriminalkommissar Johannes Strübing. Strübing used the typical gamut of Gestapo techniques for interrogation that included physical threats, blackmail, flattery, the presentation of fake and real evidence of wrongdoing and torture.

On the 5 September 1942, Heilmann was arrested and shortly after on the 8th, Libertas Schulze-Boysen was arrested. Gestapo Kriminalsekretär Alfred Göpfert was assigned to interrogate Libertas Schulze-Boysen. Göpfert used subterfuge in the form of Gertrud Breiter, a Gestapo secretary who worked in Department IV E-6 to befriend Schulze-Boysen and then inform on her. Breiter used deceit to convince Schulze-Boysen that she was hostile to her superiors and that Göpfert didn't have any serious evidence against her and due to her family connections with Hermann Göring, her life would be safe. Schulze-Boysen began to believe that Breiter was a friend. She confided in her many details of the resistance but also tried to use Breiter to warn her friends, which sealed her fate.

The next couple to be picked up by the Gestapo were the Harnacks, who were arrested on 7 September 1942 while they were on holiday in the Preila on the Curonian Spit. The Harnacks were interrogated by Kriminalinspektor Walter Habecker. Habecker was an older officer, a bald-headed thug of the old school who was under the command of Horst Kopkow, who was 17 years younger. He had been ordered to use "Enhanced interrogation", (Verschärfte Vernehmung) on prisoners and if that was not effective he had been ordered to take further necessary action as needed. Habecker was known for using two particularly brutal torture techniques. The first was known as "Hanging", where the prisoner had their hands tied behind their knees and then they were hung on a ladder and then whipped. The second was known as the "Tibetan Prayer Windmill" where pencil-sized pieces of wood, that he called "chopsticks", were inserted between the fingers and the fingers squeezed together. It was said to cause intense pain. Habecker would go on to interrogate Rudolf von Scheliha, Carl Helfrich, Günther and Joy Weisenborn and many others including Erna Eifler and Wilhelm Fellendorf

After the first six arrests the Gestapo had obtained sufficient evidence to arrest a large number of people. Between 12 and 16 September 1942, another 35 people were arrested and taken to either the prison at Gestapo HQ or to the city jail on Alexanderplatz. In this operation, house searches were conducted, looking for evidence. For example, when Hannelore Thiel (Note: Hannelore Thiel was only 18 and pregnant when she was arrested and survived the war. Her husband Fritz Thiel was executed.) was arrested on 16 September 1942, the search found an amplifying device for a Volksempfänger radio, a KPD pamphlet Organisiert den revolutionären Massenkampf gegen Faschismus und imperialistischen Krieg ("Organize the revolutionary mass struggle against fascism and imperialist war") as well as several books that included Das Kapital by Karl Marx. When Helmut Roloff was captured 17 September 1942, the first radio transmitter built in a suitcase, which was non-functional was recovered by the Gestapo.

By the end of October 1942, more than 100 people had been arrested and final reports were being prepared. The Sonderkommando then moved to Hamburg on 15 October 1942, when the RSHA sent Habecker to lead a new investigation using the leads they garnered from the interrogations. Erna Eifler was the first to be arrested on the 15 October. Due to the German tradition of Sippenhaft, the term for the idea that a family or clan shares the responsibility for a crime or act committed by one of its members, many family members and others who were only tangentially linked to the resistance were arrested and charged as well. For example, when Eifler was arrested, Heinz Priess who hid her in Hamburg and his mother Marie Priess were also arrested.

=== Paris ===
The Abwehr in Brussels and the Sonderkommando had full control of the Red Orchestra in Belgium and the Netherlands well before the end of 1942 and the funkspiel was in operation. There is no clear indication as to when Giering, Piepe and the Sonderkommando moved to Paris, various sources indicate it was either mid-September 1942 or October 1942. Gilles Perrault reports it was later summer rather than early autumn. When the unit moved, it relocated to offices in the French ministry of the interior at 11 Rue des Saussaies. Before leaving, Piepe and Giering agreed that Rajchmann would be the best person to take to Paris and find Trepper. When they arrived in Paris, Giering sent Rajchmann out to visit all the dead letterboxes that he knew about, while leaving a message to Trepper to contact him.

==== Simex ====
However, Trepper knew the Gestapo were searching for him and never made contact with Rajchmann. Giering then tried to establish a meeting with a contact, using information from the correspondence between Simexco and an employee of the Paris office of the Belgian Chamber of Commerce. That ultimately proved unsuccessful, so Giering turned back to investigating Simexco. Since he had begun monitoring Simexco Brussels, he had been suspicious of the large amount of business telegrams the company had exchanged with Simex in Paris. However, only an examination of the companies register would provide the evidence that Trepper working under the codename Gilbert was involved in the company. Giering decided not to contact the French economic police, for fear of informers exposing the investigation. Giering visited the Seine District Commercial Court where he discovered that Léon Grossvogel was a shareholder of Simex. He knew from the Jeffremov interrogation that Grossvogel was one of Trepper's assistants. Giering and Piepe decided to contact the Organisation Todt in Paris for help to determine if they could provide a way to identify where Trepper was located, instead of approaching Simex directly. Giering obtained a signed certificate of cooperation from Otto von Stülpnagel, the military commander of occupied France and visited the Todt offices. The director of the Todt offices in Paris was shown the photograph found in the Atrebates raid and immediately confirmed that the man was Monsieur Gilbert, the alias that Trepper was using in his dealings with Simex.

==== Trepper captured ====
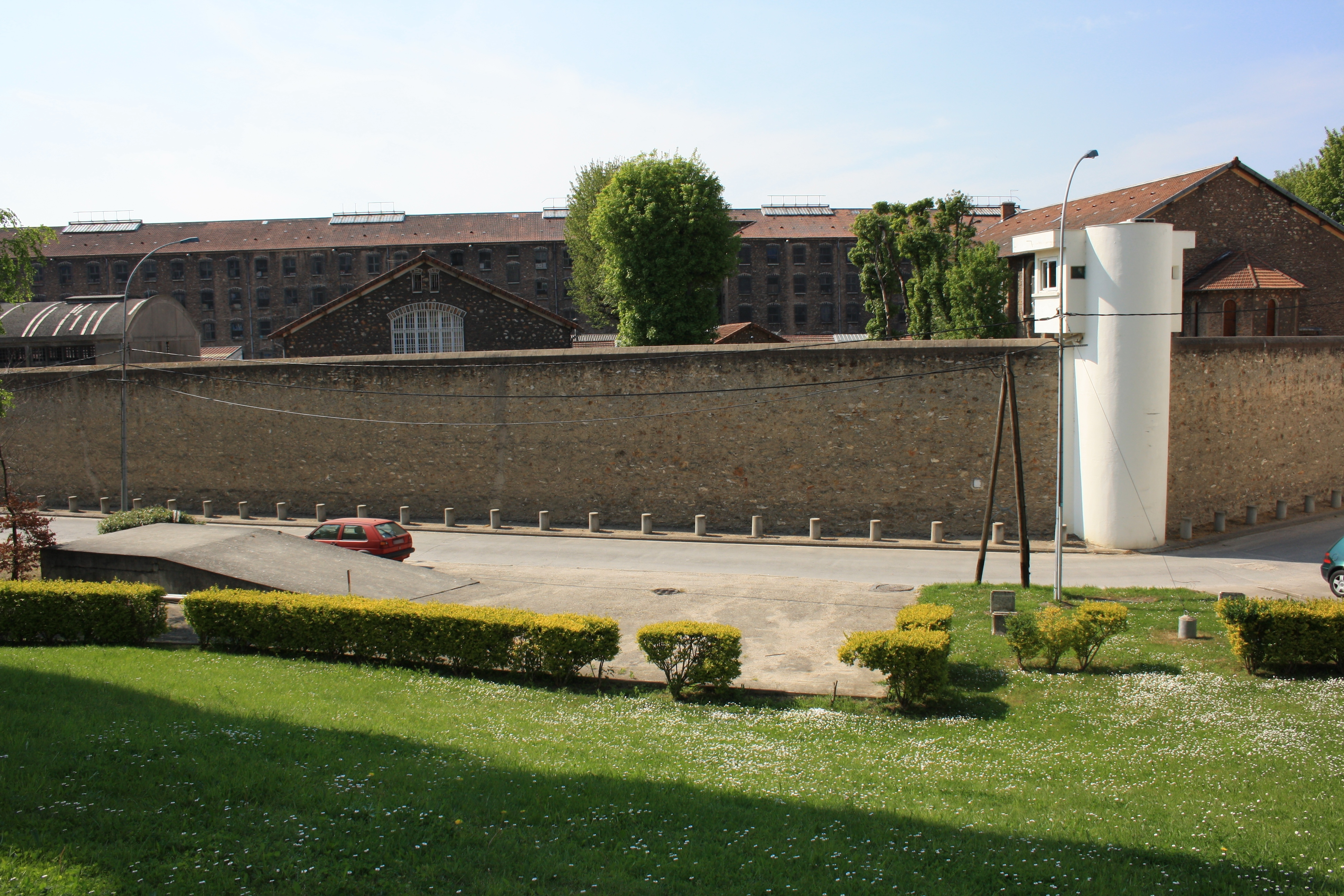
Fresnes Prison in Paris

Giering and Pipe decide to try a simple ruse to trap Trepper by posing as Mainz businessmen seeking to buy 1.5million marks worth of industrial diamonds, using a well-prepared and well-researched back story. They hoped the large size of the trade would expose Trepper, who would endorse the large trade by signing the contract, in a gesture of goodwill. However, the ruse failed. Giering decided to start arresting employees of Simex. On 19 November 1942, Suzanne Cointe, a comintern member who was the accountant and secretary for Simex. Alfred Corbin the commercial director of the firm and Vladimir Keller, the Simex translator were arrested the day after. Keller was immediately tortured using a rope tied around his legs and tightened with a stick, but failed to provide any information. Corbin interrogation failed to disclose the location of Gilbert, so Giering decided to send for a torture expert. Both Keller and Corbin were then sent to Fresnes Prison. However, on 24 November 1942, Corbin's wife told the Abwehr that Corbin had given Trepper the name of a dentist, as he had been suffering toothache. After being tortured, Corbin provided Giering of the address of Trepper's dentist. Trepper was subsequently arrested on 24 November by Giering, while he was sitting in a dentist's chair. On the 24 November, Giering contacted Hitler to inform him of the capture of Trepper.

===== Interrogation =====
Both Trepper and Gurevich, who had been arrested on 9 November 1942, in Marseille were brought to Fresnes Prison. They were treated well by Giering, who led the interrogation of Trepper. The Sonderkommando hoped to use Trepper and the remains of his network in France to discover and destroy the French Communist Party (PCF) resistance in France. To do this, Giering had to keep the arrest of Trepper secret. Trepper believed that the German goal was to weaken the Allies in a manner that would enable the Germans to eventually make a separate peace treaty with the United Kingdom and the United States. In the interim, he hoped to eventually contact Soviet intelligence to warn them.

After his initial interrogation at Fresnes, Trepper was imprisoned on a third floor room on the 11 Rue des Saussaies in Paris where further interrogations took place. He offered to collaborate with the Abwehr, by naming all his associates and insisted that wireless contact be maintained with Soviet intelligence. Giering subsequently treated Trepper leniently in the expectation that he would serve as a double agent in Paris. Trepper informed Giering that his family and relatives in the USSR would be killed if it became known to Soviet intelligence that he had been captured. Giering agreed that should Trepper collaborate, his arrest would remain a secret. The Germans regarded the arrest as one of their most important operational achievements. When his interrogation began, he was so sure in his deliberations that the Germans didn't believe he was sincere. To allay their fears he phoned his secretary Hillel Katz which established his bona fides. According to Piepe, when Trepper talked, it was not out of fear of torture or defeat, but out of duty. While he gave up the names and addresses of most of the members of his own network, he was sacrificing his associates to protect the various members of the PCF, whom he had an absolute belief in. However, Trepper would eventually penetrate the PCF in a funkspiel operation, in a complete betrayal, leading to the arrest of many members of the PCF. Unlike Trepper, Gurevich refused to name any agents he had recruited.

===== Betrayal =====
The first person that Trepper betrayed was Léon Grossvogel who was arrested in November 1942. During the search of Léon Grossvogel's apartment, Trepper's passport had been discovered and when Giering showed it to Trepper, he admitted that that was his real name. At the time, Trepper was worried that Giering would discover his code name "Domb" that he was known in French Communist Party groups. The Sonderkommando sent an agent to Nowy Targ, (Note: Perrault stated the town was called Neumarkt, which is the German appellation for Nowy Targ.) to enquire after Trepper's family. While he was being interrogated, he was read a report that detailed how all his family, 48 members in total, including his mother, brothers, sisters, aunts, uncles and cousins had been sent to the gas chamber and it was now considered judenrein by the Germans. Even the family cemetery had been destroyed and ploughed up. Hillel Katz was the next lieutenant that Trepper betrayed, and was arrested on the 2 December 1942. Over the next several days many members of the espionage network in France and Belgium were betrayed by Trepper and arrested. These included many employees and people associated with the Simexco trading company in Brussels including the banker, Charles Drailly, the salesman Jean Passelecq, Simexco shareholder Robert Jean Christen, the accountant Henry Seghers, the secretary Erich Nutis and the company secretary Jeanne Ponsaint, who hadn't been rounded in the initial raid on Simexco. The people associated with Simex in Paris were also betrayed along with their families. When many of the most senior people in the espionage network had been arrested, Trepper turned to exposing his closest associates in the smaller networks that made up the main group in France. The first of these were Anna Maximovitch who was arrested with her brother Basile Maximovitch on 12 December 1942.

===== New leads =====
It was important for the Sonderkommando to move quickly, so that Soviet Intelligence didn't discover that the network had been compromised. Both Grossvogel and Katz had refused to divulge any information, even though they were subject to enhanced interrogation, so the unit had to turn to other leads. The investigation progressed with the arrest of Fernand Vion, who was responsible for centralising intelligence for transmission by the French Communist Party (PCF). He was also responsible for the technical apparatus in the PCF. Vion was in contact with Robert Giraud, who was the main liaison between the Trepper network and the PCF, and he was arrested on 12 December 1942. Through Giraud, the Sonderkommando discovered a radio transmitter that included details of the cipher keys used by the PCF. These keys enabled the Sonderkommando to start the funkspiel operation for Trepper's radio transmitter on 17 December 1943, which was successful. The arrest of Vion and Giraud, led to the arrest of the courier Käte Voelkner on 7 January 1943.

===== The search for Robinson =====
Since the early 1930's Henry Robinson had been living clandestinely and legally within France as the police had neither his photograph, nor his fingerprints, nor was he registered on the electoral roll and he lived alone in a hotel in Rue du Général Bertrand. Giering began the investigation into Robinson in December 1942 based on information provided by Trepper. The capture of Robinson and his espionage network were essential to ensure the success of the funkspiel operation. The first meeting between Trepper and Robinson had taken place in early September 1941 in Medardo Griotto, a forger and his wife Anna Griotto's house. So Giering decided to send Rajchmann to contact Medardo Griotto to arrange a meeting at a metro station on Avenue de Suffren. Robinson who was an extremely careful man was nevertheless arrested by Piepe and Reiser at the metro station on 20 December 1942. At the time of his arrest, Robinson had four false passports in his possession, as well as the infamous Robinson papers that were discovered under the floorboards of his hotel room. Griotto was arrested the next day.

===== Destruction of the Lyon base =====
In 1937, a safehouse was established at 42 Avenue Berthelot in Lyon by Joseph Katz, the brother of Hillel Katz. At the beginning of 1942, the safehouse began to be used when the espionage network in Belgium was broken up. The Belgian courier Isidore Springer and his wife, the dance teacher Flore Valaerts were the first ones to arrive. By the end of the summer when the Dutch network was under investigation, it was decided to establish a radio transmitter in Lyon to take over from the Parisian network if the need arose. A new residency was established by Springer that became Trepper's 6th espionage network in Europe. When Germaine Schneider arrived in the late summer 1942, it was decided she would teach wireless telegraphy to the agents on site and established a radio transmitter on Fourvière Hill, close to 16 Rue des Anges where she lived.

Giering knew the names of the agents in Lyon as they had been provided by Trepper, who clarified the investigation details that Giering already knew. In November 1942, Schneider was arrested hiding in Marcelle Capre's apartment in Paris, after being betrayed by Jeffremov. Katz was arrested on 17 December 1942, after a courier was spotted by Rajchmann. During interrogation Katz denied being part of the network instead stating that his relations with the brother were familial in nature only. However, by the end of the month he was transported to a concentration camp in Germany, via Fresnes Prison in Belgium. Isidore Springer was arrested on the 19 December 1942 and committed suicide in Fresnes Prison 5 days later. Flore Valaerts was sent to Plötzensee Prison where she was guillotined on 20 August 1943. The radio repair technician Otto Schumacher who was the last to arrive in Lyon, fled to Paris with his wife Helene Humbert-Laroche when the arrests began. The couple were arrested by the Sonderkommando in early 1943.

===== Trepper report =====
During his incarceration, Trepper was provided with paper, pencil and a dictionary by Giering, in the hope that Trepper's writings or scribbles would prove useful. Trepper had managed to save a piece of paper that he hid in the leg of his bed frame. For months before his capture, Trepper had been trying to warn Soviet intelligence of the existence of the Sonderkommando but had failed and he planned to use the paper to record a report, that should he escape could be passed to the Soviets to warn them. In the beginning of May 1942 he began writing the report in minute detail where he recorded his arrest, his interrogation, details of the Sonderkommando staff, records of his time in Fresnes prison and a list of agents who believed had already been captured. The secret report was written in Hebrew, Yiddish and Polish in the forlorn hope that should the report be discovered that it would take three translators to read it fully.

===== Moussier meeting =====
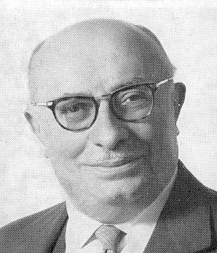
Jacques Duclos was the most senior member of the PCF

Trepper needed to employ subterfuge to ensure the report reached Soviet intelligence. He started by trying to convince Giering that it was important that he met with French resistance fighter and PCF agent Juliette Moussier, while he was in custody to prove to Soviet intelligence that he was still free and enable the funkspiel operation to continue. Moussier was the liaison between Trepper's network and the French Communist Party via Fernand Pauriol, the director of the PCF communications. However, Giering decided to send Rajchmann instead and she pretended not know him. The reason for this was that Trepper had instructed her beforehand not to recognise anybody from Trepper's network, apart from Trepper himself.

Once Trepper learned that Katz has been arrested, he suggested that Katz should meet Moussier. During his imprisonment, Trepper had become friends with Willi Berg, a Sonderkommando officer who was his guard, and he used this to his advantage. Trepper managed to convinced Giering, with the help of Berg, that Katz needed instruction on how to approach Moussier and suggested speaking to Katz in Yiddish, a language that the Sonderkommando translator was capable of understanding, since he didn't know French and Katz couldn't speak German. By speaking Yiddish, Trepper was able to relay secret instructions to Katz, simply to tell Moussier that he had a report and needed to pass it to Jacques Duclos for transmission to Soviet intelligence, without the Sonderkommando guards, translator or Giering knowing what he was doing. Katz made two visits to Moussier, all the while under heavy surveillance by the Sonderkommando but was allowed to enter the apartment of Moussier and speak to her along without the presence of a Sonderkommando guard that was a fatal mistake by Giering. On the first visit he instructed Moussier to contact Duclos. On the second visit, Moussier confirmed that she had made the contact, and instructed Katz that Trepper should make the visit. At the time, Giering was extremely suspicious that Trepper was setting some kind of trap but couldn't discern what it was, but finally agreed to it. On 23 May 1943, Trepper received permission from Giering to contact Moussier., In early June 1943, Trepper met Moussier and passed a message from Giering, supposedly from Trepper to inform Soviet Intelligence that the French Rote Kapelle was still functioning, as well his own report (Note: Treppers report survived and was found in 1990 in the archives of the Comintern. Bourgeois has analysed the report.) and a letter instructing Duclos to send the report to Soviet intelligence as soon as possible. Trepper suggested to Giering that the transmissions should cease for a month, to give the appearance of the network being reorganised, to which he agreed. However, when the Sonderkommando returned to confirm with Moussier whether the message was sent, she was missing. Trepper had instructed her to disappear immediately and not reveal any details of the meeting. Moussier went into hiding. During the summer, Moussier's main contact Fernand Pauriol, visited Moussier and her husband Milo in Beugne l'Abbe, west of Luçon and arranged for the couple to disappear.

==== Treppers PCF penetration ====
===== The Great Game =====
On 25 December 1942, Trepper was informed that he would be running a funkspiel that was known as "Eiffel". When Trepper wrote his memoir, "Le grand jeu" (The Great Game), he attached such great importance to the funkspiel as a successful operation that he considered it his greatest victory. Trepper wrote that he succeeded in turning the worst of situations in his favour by convincing the Germans that only a meeting with a PCF contact could convince Soviet intelligence that he was free. He warned Soviet intelligence of the arrests in Paris and convinced them to seriously participate in the funkspiel, so as to both poison the funkspiel communications in a way that was beneficial to the Soviets and at the same time expose German plans. However, this was complete fabrication. Trepper claimed he managed to contact Soviet intelligence which was correct, but the claim that he received a response on the 23 February is false. (Note: This date is confirmed to be false in Firsov, Klehr, Haynes "Secret Cables of the Comintern 1933-1943".) The 23 February date which was both detailed by VE Tarrant in "The Red Orchestra" and Gilles Perraults "The Red Orchestra" was in fact the beginning of May, when Moussier is handed the message. This meant that Trepper had been imprisoned for more 4 months, while in contact with the PCF without them knowing he was captured, while it was being investigated and hunted by the Sonderkommando.

===== Treppers funkspiel =====
On 25 December 1942, the first message sent by the funkspiel, was an request for Trepper to meet with a PCF contact. The meeting fell through resulting in Jacques Duclos receiving a message from the GRU on 18 February to arrange a new meeting with PCF contact "Michel". New dates were arranged for 7 or 14 March which was also missed due to Trepper changing the location. A new meeting was set for 18 or 25 April 1943, on the Sunday of the week but these were missed. The GRU didn't believe that Trepper messages were part of a deception plan and continued to arrange meeting dates, although the Comintern believed he was captured and tried to warn them. By 26 May, the PCF still believed the French network had not been compromised. The message exchange proved that Trepper passed his message to Moussier in June 1943. On 5 June, Duclos confirmed that Trepper was arrested. On 7 July 1943, the first part of Treppers report was transmitted to Soviet intelligence by Jacques Duclos. The second part followed on 10 July. (Note: Treppers report had been read by Duclos but it had taken some weeks to encipher the text due to its size. That was why it was transmitted in two parts.)

In June 1943, Soviet GRU officer Ivan Bolchakov conducted an analysis of the received messages from December 1942 and found that 23 out 63 were of sufficient quality and only 4 were considered valuable. It was indication of the low quality of the funkspiel operation, but it was still many weeks before the GRU realised it had been deceived.

===== Betrayal of the PCF =====
The reasons for Trepper changing the dates in his memoir are not clear. Trepper named his associate "Michel" as Louis Grojnowski as the person he wished to meet. However, Grojnowski ran the trade union organisation Main-d'œuvre immigrée but was not directly associated with the PCF clandestine radio transmission organisation. Bourgeois identified "Michel" as Roland Madigou, an intermediary between Trepper and Fernand Pauriol, the main wireless telegraphy specialist for the PCF, indicating that Treppers deception was designed to penetrate the PCF. Certainly the impact of the June transmission generated suspicions about Treppers loyalty, due to the odd way the PCF had received the report in the first place, resulting in the GRU instructing Duclos to determine how they had received it. For between four and five months, the Sonderkommando were operating against the PCF with the help of Trepper, that resulted in many GRU and PCF people being captured.

==== Gurevich's funkspiel ====
Gurevich was placed in a room next to Trepper at Rue des Saussaies. Although Trepper had betrayed some details on Gurevich, Giering hadn't fully determined his identity when he arrived at the office but knew he was a GRU officer. Both Trepper and Gurevich showed an extreme hostility towards each other, so they were offered few chances to speak to each other. In his memoir "Un certain monsieur Kent" Gurevich confirmed many details of Treppers imprisonment by the Gestapo including the lax conditions he was held in and the fact that Giering trusted Trepper more than Gurevich. When Gurevich returned to Moscow at the end of the war, he reported that Trepper was a true honest collaborator of the Gestapo.

In March 1943, Gurevich started a funkspiel operation using his codes that was known as "Mars". On 28 March, Gurevich sent his first funkspiel radio transmission. He was informed by Soviet intelligence that he had been promoted to Captain for restarting a transmitter crucial to the functioning of the group. In a message received from Soviet intelligence on 14 March 1943, Gurevich was instructed to contact Latvian general Waldemar Ozols who had formerly ran an espionage network in France but had lost contact with the Soviet embassy in Paris when France was invaded.

Gurevich finally made contact on 18 August and reactivated Ozols (Note: Kesaris states the date of activation in July 1943.) using a pre-arranged code word. As Ozols didn't know that Gurevich had been arrested, he informed him of his espionage work covering the period from July 1941 to July 1943. Gurevich ordered Ozols to reactivate his network and recruit the Mithridate resistance organisation based in Marseille. The Mithridate network was founded by Pierre-Jean Herbinger. The Marseille branch was run by reserve army captain Paul Legendre. Giering wanted to bring the Mithridate network under the control of the Sonderkommando to use an intelligence source and run it as part of Gurevich's funkspiel operation.

==== PCF radio organisation ====
The investigation into why Moussier was missing was still ongoing but she couldn't be located. Giering decided with the help of Trepper to try another line of investigation. He ordered a search for Fernand Pauriol, a name given to him by the V-Mann Abraham Rajchmann. (Note: V-Mann, short for Vertrauens-mann. (German:V-Mann, plural V-Leute). They were generally prisoners who agreed to work as undercover agents on pain of death, should they have refused.) However, although they searched all over France for several months, there was no sign of him. Giering decided to adopt another approach. On the 27 May 1943, he used the Trepper's codes to forward a message to Soviet intelligence to send them the name of a radio technician to repair Trepper's malfunctioning radio transmitter. The plan worked as they received the name of a Saint-Denis, Paris based repair technician, named Georges "JoJo" Vayssairat. Vayssairat was arrested and tortured, and also became a V-Mann. Vayssairat exposed the name of Auguste, real name Eugène Granet. He was arrested and gave the name of Michel, re: Roland Madigou who was tortured for 12 days in Fresnes Prison before deciding to also become a V-Mann. Madigou betrayed the name of an individual François who was hiding in Bordeaux. He was arrested by the Sonderkommando on 13 August 1943 during a meeting with Vayssairat and taken to Fresnes Prison. Pauriol was tortured for three weeks but choose to remain silent before eventually exposing his own identity as Pauriol. However, he never exposed any information on the PCF. The Sonderkommando discovered six storage locations in different areas of Paris during the investigation of Pauriol, with the main one located in a house in Longjumeau that contained all the modern equipment necessary to build radio transmitters.

While Giering was searching for Pauriol, the Sonderkommando's clandestine work led to the arrest of several members of the PCF radio organisation. The first to be arrested were three PCF women resistance fighters in Saint-Vérand on 30 July 1943. Radio operator and Comintern member Francine Fromond had parachuted into France in January 1942 to establish a radio station near Montpellier. Two other women, both radio operators Josephine Turin along with Fromonds mother Germaine Pointeau-Fromond, who were to assist her, were also arrested on the same day. Vayssairat and Madigou betrayed several other individuals who worked for the PCF underground radio organisation. These included Fernand Moronval, a PCF radio instructor who was arrested on 28 August 1943 along with Jules Rauch, a radio transmitter manufacturer, who had been recruited by Pauriol.

==== Sonderkommando Pannwitz ====
Sonderkommando command structure when Pannwitz took command of the unit in August 1943.

As the months past, Giering became ill with throat cancer and his deputy, Gestapo officer Kriminalkommissar Heinrich Reiser, took over the Parisian command in June 1943. At the time, Geiring still led the investigation. Reiser formerly took over command of the unit and the investigation in August 1943, when Giering's throat cancer reached an advanced stage and had to retire. (Note: Bourgeois gives the date as mid-1943.) Reiser was an ineffective officer and was ordered to return to Germany to work at the Karlsruhe police station. He was replaced by Kriminalkommissar Alfred Goepfert, a Gestapo officer. Heinz Pannwitz, a type described by William L. Shirer as "the intellectual gangsters of the Third Reich", was employed in August 1943 to take over the investigation in France. He had been working in Gestapo HQ in Berlin since the spring of 1943 on the investigation of the German Red Orchestra.

While in Berlin, Pannwitz had read Giering's reports and was disinclined to believe that Trepper had exposed his colleagues for any altruistic reasons. Trepper was glad to see Giering leave as the it would be to his advantage but only partially right:

"., "Giering, with his great skepticism of a policeman, thought that the Jews were not worth more than the others. [Whereas] Pannwitz believed they were worth less than the others"

When Pannwitz took over the unit, he changed the work ethos of the unit, such that the political aspect of the investigation was developed at the expense of the operational investigation. Pannwitz believed that the funkspiel had achieved its objectives by gaining the Soviets trust and wanted to initiate a more direct approach with the Soviets, in essence an attempt to sow distrust between the allies. He began by adding political messages to the military information that would have been normally sent. As the months past, Pannwitz inserted more and more political content into the funkspiels, seeking to build a rapport with Soviet intelligence. He suggested to Himmler that an envoy who was specially selected by Trepper could be sent to the Soviet Union, to discuss matters of exceptional interest, however Himmler rejected the idea. Instead, Pannwitz reversed the idea, by transmitting long messages to Soviet intelligence that described a powerful group of anti-Nazis who favoured the Soviet Union and who wanted to talk to a representative from the country. The rendezvous was arranged to take place at Hillel Katzs' old apartment at Rue Edmond-Roger. When Pannwitz and Trepper attended the rendezvous, they were surprised to discover Rajchmann staying in the apartment with no sign of Soviet intelligence.

==== Treppers escape ====
On 13 September 1943, Trepper escaped custody while visiting a pharmacy in the centre of Paris that had multiple exits. When Pannwitz informed Heinrich Müller of the escape, he persuaded Müller not to tell Himmler. On the 17 September, Trepper made contact with his lover Georgie De Winter and they hid together at a house in Le Vésinet. Trepper planned to use De Winter to contact Suzanne Spaak and her husband, Jean Claude Spaak, a playwright and PCF resistance fighter. However the plan was fraught was difficulty as he had no contact with the Spaaks for more than a year and didn't know where they lived, resulting in De Winter having to make enquiries to find their address, exposing her to discovery and Treppers arrest. Trepper hoped that he could contact the PCF to send a message to the Soviet military attaché in London to warn them of the collapse of the network. At the same time he hoped to receive monies from Claude Spaak to the sum of 130,000 Francs, that had been deposited by the Sokols as his emergency funds. Trepper wanted to restart his clandestine activities but was wary of De Winter being identified by the Gestapo due to her constant enquiries in search of the Spaaks home and later visits to the Spaak household. After 4 days, the couple moved to house in Suresnes belonging to the Queyrie family. On 29 September 1943, Trepper received the money from Claude Spaak and arranged for a PCF contact to meet him at a church in Auteuil. He then gave the money to De Winter for expenses and sent her to a hideout in a village near Chartres in the hope that she could be smuggled into the non-occupied zone. De Winter was provided with a letter of introduction by Antonia Lyon-Smith, a friend of the Spaaks, to a local doctor in Saint-Pierre-de-Chartreuse who was with the resistance.

Pannwitz first questioned Gurevich after Trepper escaped but couldn't provide any salient leads. Giering then interrogated Hillel Katz, who exposed the name of De Winter, a name that was unknown. Katz had known De Winter since 1941. Katz's interrogation led to the address of a Le Pecq nursery that De Winter had used for her son. On 2 October 1943, the investigation led to the arrest of Antoine Queyrie, a family friend of De Winter, who took her son to her grandparents house when she went on the run with Trepper. The investigation eventually led to De Winter being arrested on 17 October 1943 by the Gestapo, while on route to Chartres. At the same time, Trepper went to the church in Auteuil and noticed a black Citroën car — the signature car of the Gestapo — and fled. The interrogation of De Winter led to the arrest of Suzanne Spaak on 9 November 1943. Trepper managed to evade capture by the Sonderkommando and hid with friends until the end of the war.

==== Sonderkommando in disarray ====
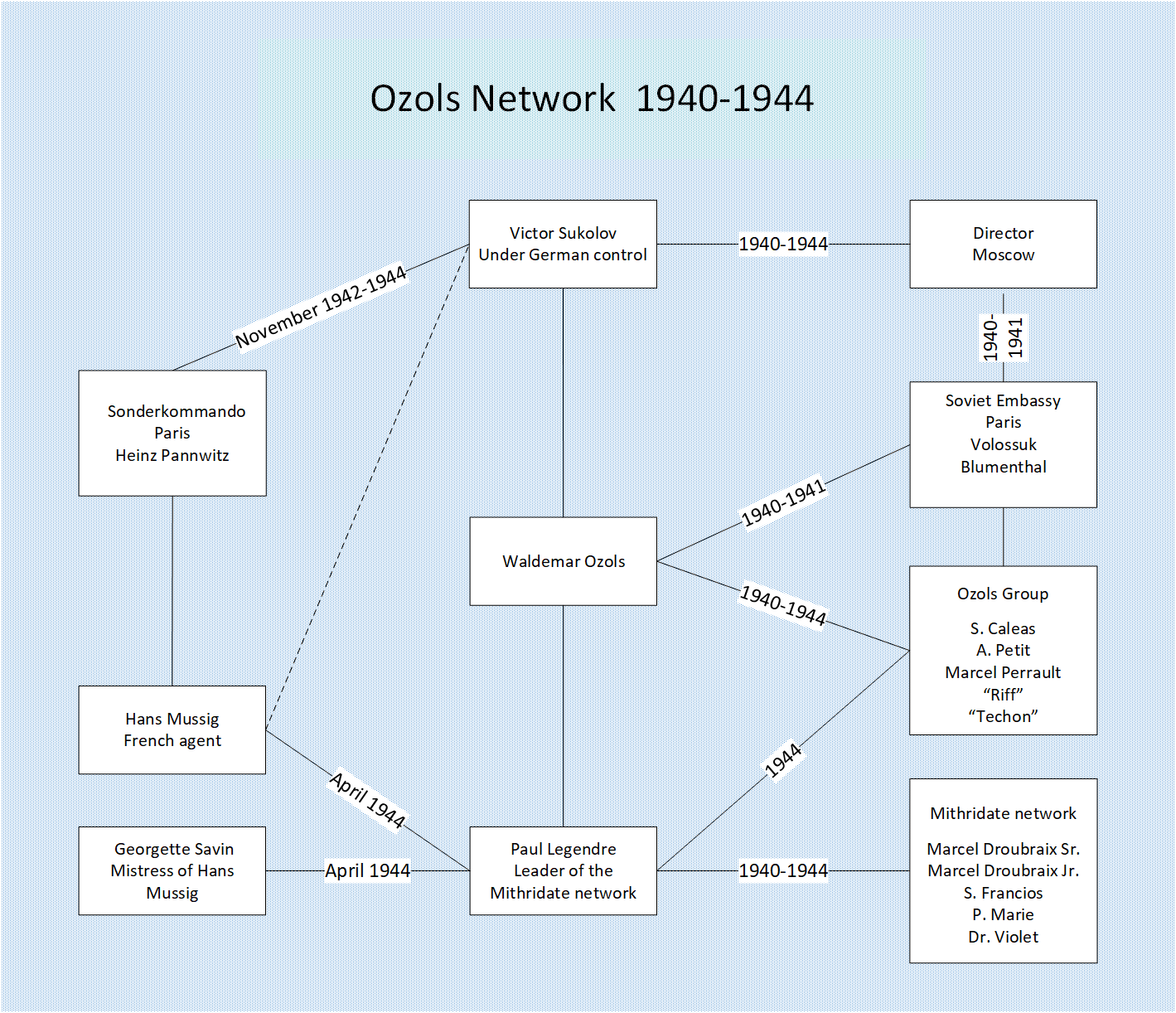
The Ozols and Mithridate network was controlled by Panwitz through Gurevich's funkspiel.

After Treppers escape, the Sonderkommando received an order to execute the prisoners that took part in first funkspiel that had begun in 1942. Both Hillel Katz and Otto Schumacher disappear from Neuilly at this time and their exact fate is unknown. It is likely that the prisoners were transferred to Fresnes prison and tried in May 1944. Certainly Roeder held a second trial during that month, in the Roger & Gallet building on 62-64 Rue du Faubourg Saint-Honoré, Paris. Other prisoners in the first group, like Leon Grossvogel, were kept alive in the hope they could be monetized. De Winter was informed that she would be a witness against Grossvogel in the trial, but it is not known what happened to him afterwards. De Winter survived the war.

In the early months of 1944, the funkspiel operation continued, particularly when the radio transmitters were moved into the Sonderkommando offices. Gurevich continued his funkspiel operation against the Mithridate network and was complicit in the arrest of several resistance fighters, including Paul Heldorf, a Geheime Feldpolizei radio officer who defected to the resistance. In June 1944, British Royal Horse Artillery Captain Marcel Droubaix, who was Paul Legendre's deputy discovered the penetration of the Mithridate network. On 18 July 1944, Gurevich arranged a meeting with Droubaix and a colleague in Paris and had him arrested. He was deported to Buchenwald concentration camp. The Mithridate network continued to supply information to the Germans after the Liberation of Paris in August 1944.

As the funkspiel continued into 1944, Pannwitz modified his political message, in an attempt to present a myth of a left-wing opposition in Hitlers government, that he represented. This was a mitigation strategy in his part as he knew that if he was captured by Soviet forces he would stand trial. In this way, he hoped to gain the trust of Soviet government and save his own life.

On 16 August 1944 Pannwitz took Gurevich and his lover Barcza away from Paris when the Sonderkommando was forced to withdraw. Gurevich continued the funkspiel under the leadership of Pannwitz with a radio station that was established somewhere in the Alsace region.

== Disintegration ==
In April 1945, the Sonderkommando unit moved to the Bregenz area of Vorarlberg in Austria. At that point the unit consisted of eight SS officers and men along with twenty French and ten Flemish agents. During the following two months, Pannwitz burnt the Rote Kapelle archive including the funkspiel reports, orders from Berlin and other materials.

According to Gestapo officer Friedrich Berger, Pannwitz planned to continue the war against the allies by staging a comeback, through the assassination of prominent allied individuals including Winston Churchill, although how that could be achieved was not disclosed. The funkspiel operation continued until May 1945. On 3 May 1945, Pannwitz along with his secretary Elena Kemp and radio operator Hermann Stluka along with Gurevich were arrested on 3 May 1945 by French forces near Bludenz, Vorarlberg, Austria. In June 1945, the whole group was transported to Moscow. On 4 December 1946, Pannwitz, Kemp and Stluka were convicted of espionage against Soviet forces. Pannwitz was sentenced to 25 years in prison, Kempová received 20 years and radio operator Stluka 15 years. In January 1947, Gurevich was sentenced to 20 years jail for treason.

== See also ==
- Funkabwehr
- People of the Red Orchestra
