= Antonia Lyon-Smith =

British girl stranded in France in WWII

Antonia Lyon-Smith (20 September 1925 in Toronto, Ontario - 9 October 2010 in Seaton, Devon, England) was an Englishwoman who at age 14 was accidentally left in Brittany in France by her parents, at the start of World War II, when the area was overrun by the German advance in June 1940. She was interned along with her nanny in a camp in Besançon and was released with the help of the Red Cross, and moved to Neuilly. She was able to secure identity papers and moved to Paris where she made several attempts to escape to Spain and Switzerland. She made contact with the playwright Claude Spaak, brother of the Belgian foreign minister Paul-Henri Spaak and member of the French resistance, who was involved with a Soviet espionage group that would later be called the Red Orchestra ("Rote Kapelle"). Unwittingly asked to write a letter of introduction for the Spaaks, for a member of the group to meet a Belgian doctor, who was also working in the resistance, it was eventually discovered by the Gestapo and she was arrested by the Sonderkommando Rote Kapelle and interrogated for several months. She was released and after the war was flown back to Great Britain, where she met her mother. After the war, she was interviewed by MI5 in connection with her release from the Gestapo and Red Orchestra. She was also known as Antonia Hunt, under which name she published an autobiography.

== Life ==
Lyon-Smith Née Smith, was the daughter of the Canadian housewife Phyllis Alleyne Lyon-Smith née Hellmuth and British Brigadier Tristram Lyon-Smith. On 16 May 1943, Brigadier Lyon-Smith, who fought in the North African campaign, was recommended for a Distinguished Service Order for outstanding courage in the field. It was awarded on 8 July 1943. Lyon-Smith received a second honour in the form of a military CBE on 11 October 1945 for outstanding powers of leadership as Commander Royal Artillery of 7th Armoured Division (CRA 7th Armoured Desert Rats). Her grandfather was Isaac Hellmuth.

When she was six, Lyon-Smith travelled to Egypt with her parents, when her father was stationed there for two years at the British Army garrison in Heliopolis in Cairo. Two years later, her parents were posted to India and the family felt that the place was unsuitable for a child, so Lyon-Smith stayed with her cousins Marcel and Diane Provost, in Menglas, Concarneau in Brittany. The Provosts owned a fish canning business and also two houses, one in Paris and one in Concarneau. Two years later, her parents were posted back to Great Britain and Lyon-Smith joined them at the military base at Catterick Garrison in North Yorkshire when she was thirteen.

== Brittany ==
With the start of World War II, Lyon-Smith's father's regiment was sent to France as part of the British Expeditionary Force. Lyon-Smith and her mother were forced to move out of the garrison. Lyon-Smith was sent to boarding school, while her mother stayed with friends. Later in the year, her mother gave Lyon-Smith the choice of spending the war in Brittany at her cousin's or go to stay at her grandmother's house on Lake Simcoe in Ontario for the duration of the war. Phyllis Lyon-Smith's reasoning was based on the belief that the Second World War would be similar to the first and that being in France meant her husband would not need to travel back to Great Britain to see them. She also believed that Brittany would be a safe place for her daughter. In November 1939, both Lyon-Smith and her mother travelled to Concarneau via Calais. After Phyllis received a telegram that her husband was back in Great Britain, she decided to move back. However, believing that Brittany was a safe location for her daughter and as she was under 16 was covered by the provisions of the Geneva Conventions, she left her daughter in the charge of her cousins, in June 1940. She also left her jewellery with Lyon-Smith.

== World War II ==
On 21 June 1940, the German Army occupied Concarneau and Marcel and Diana's house was requisitioned. The German Army started the process of moving everybody over the age of sixteen away from the coast, so Lyon-Smith was sent to a convent in Châteauneuf. After an ear infection, Lyon-Smith was taken to hospital in Quimper. In December 1940 and while still in hospital, she was interned along with her nanny and other British subjects to a camp on the outskirts of Quimper, then taken by train and lorry, along with many hundreds of other people to the condemned internment Camp (Konzentrationslager) at Besançon (Frontstalag 142 or Caserne Vauban). At the end of 1940, 2,400 women, mostly British, were interned in the barracks, along with 1600 other nationalities, in a camp suitable for only 2000 people. In March 1941, Lyon-Smith was released after the Red Cross visited the camp. She moved to a pension in Neuilly and told to report to the local police station every morning. During the freezing winter of 1941-1942, Lyon-Smith caught pneumonia. While in Neuilly, Lyon-Smith enrolled in a school under a false name, at Cours Montaigne, where she sat the Pre-Baccalaureate and passed.

=== Escape from Paris ===
In July 1941, Lyon-Smith's cousin Diana was able to procure false identity papers, the carte d'identité under the name Maria Cormet, that enabled Lyon-Smith to flee Paris. Diana Provost had made contact with playwright Claude Spaak who had arranged a forger. Spaak was brother to Paul-Henri Spaak and the husband of Suzanne Spaak. Claude Spaak was a member of the French resistance, a close friend of Leopold Trepper who ran the Soviet espionage group, the Red Orchestra ("Rote Kapelle") in France and the Low Countries. The Provosts believed that unoccupied France would be safe. Travelling under a false name, and with the help of several contacts, Lyon-Smith travelled to Bordeaux, met a contact who took her to the border, crossed and then travelled to Montauban and then took a train to Grenoble, where she met Diana's cousin Ruth Peters. However, the next morning Lyon-Smith was arrested during a mass arrest of Jews in Grenoble and taken to the De Bonne barracks internment camp. She was forced to admit to the Prefet running the barracks that she was an English schoolgirl with an English passport, as the barracks were to be cleared that night. After being released, Lyon-Smith together with Peters, visited the American embassy in Vichy to enquire about arranging travel to Spain; however nothing came of it.

=== Attempts to escape France ===
During the winter of 1942–1943, Lyon-Smith and Peters were visited by Claude Spaak at their Lancey hotel. Peters, who was in contact with several members of the Red Orchestra network, was the mistress of Spaak. Spaak was there to organise a plan for Lyon-Smith to escape France. Between September 1942 to September 1943, Lyon-Smith made a number of attempts to cross either the Spanish frontier or the Swiss border at Lake Annecy; however they were unsuccessful. During these escape attempts, Lyon-Smith would often be accompanied by Spaak or Peters. In July 1943, Lyon-Smith was interned for the third time, along with all the British people in Grenoble, but released after four days when the camp was liberated. In August, Lyon-Smith was again ill and treated by a Belgian doctor who was a member of the French resistance, from Saint-Pierre-de-Chartreuse. In late August 1943, Claude Spaak decided that Lyon-Smith and Peters should abandon the escape attempts due to the increasing presence of German forces in the area and move back to Paris separately. After organising new identity papers in the name of Antoinette Louise Savier, Lyon-Smith moved back to Paris, along with Peters who returned to Paris separately. While in Paris, Lyon-Smith's cousin Diana arranged for her to stay with a French family in Chantilly, where she could live unnoticed as a Frenchwoman. In Paris, Lyon-Smith was invited by the Spaaks to visit their apartment. While there, Suzanne Spaak asked Lyon-Smith to write a letter of introduction to the Belgian doctor, for two friends of theirs who needed to go into hiding. Naively, Lyon-Smith assumed the two people had problems with identity papers and needed help. In reality, the letter had been requested by Leopold Trepper for his mistress, Georgina De Winter who was supposed to go to a safehouse in Saint-Pierre-de-Chartreuse that was being run by the Belgian doctor. In mid-October 1943, while on the way to meet the doctor, De Winter was arrested by the Gestapo and the letter was found, implicating Lyon-Smith. De Winter was sent to Ravensbrück concentration camp and survived the war.

=== Arrest ===
On 12 or 21 October 1943 (sources vary), Lyon was arrested in Bourg-la-Reine by the Gestapo unit Sonderkommando Rote Kapelle and taken to be interrogated at 11 Rue des Saussaies in Paris. Diane Provost was also arrested in the same month by the Sonderkommando but released soon afterwards. Spaak went into hiding and managed to evade arrest as did Ruth Peters. Lyon-Smith was interrogated by Sturmbannführer Rolf Müller, who was chief of Aktion Donar, a combined operation by units of Abwehr, Funkabwehr, SIPO-SD and Orpo, that operated in Vichy France from September 1942 onwards, to search for clandestine radio transmissions. Lyon-Smith initially denied being Lyon-Smith, stating that she was Savier, even though her school books had been seized and they were tagged with her real name. She eventually admitted to being Lyon-Smith, as her French was not good enough to maintain the pretense of being a French schoolgirl and was subject to continual interrogation over months. Shortly after her arrest, Lyon-Smith caught a skin disease on her back that was not amenable to normal treatment. Over several weeks, Lyon-Smith slowly formed a dependent relationship with interpreter Karl Gagel, who wanted to marry her. Gagel was always present at the interrogations to translate Müller. Lyon-Smith pretended it was a romantic relationship with Gagel, to ensure she received preferential treatment. Gagel persuaded Heinz Pannwitz, chief of the Sonderkommando Rote Kapelle to allow Lyon-Smith to attend the surgery of a doctor in the local neighbourhood for treatment. As the months passed, passing Christmas into the spring of 1944, Lyon-Smith's condition worsened, as the doctor's treatments failed. By March 1944, Lyon-Smith was seriously ill. On 13 March 1944, she was released on leave of parole, after managing to satisfy the Gestapo that she had no connection with the French Resistance. Lyon-Smith was instructed by Pannwitz to stay with Diane Provost. In April, Lyon-Smith received a phone call from Gagel, which scared her, but she agreed to meet him, and later agreed to meet him once or twice a week to avoid reprisals. At the end of July, Gagel informed Lyon-Smith during a phone call that the Gestapo was leaving Paris and that they should meet to say goodbye, threatening her with the knowledge that he had his service pistol with him.

=== Liberation ===
After the Liberation of Paris on 25 August 1944 Lyon-Smith received a visit from her father, whose division was fighting to the north of Paris, and who arranged for her to fly home to Great Britain. Arriving in London, Lyon-Smith took a train up to Glasgow where she met her mother on the platform of Glasgow Central Station. Phyllis Lyon-Smith had lived in a hotel in Ayr for the duration of the war and worked as a member of the Royal Voluntary Service. After recovering, Lyon-Smith joined the Women's Royal Naval Service (WRNV).

== After World War II ==
On 15 July 1942, MI5 reported Lyon-Smith by opening a new named intelligence document held at Camp 020, possibly initiated by a word from Brigadier Tristram Lyon-Smith. From then to 9 February 1945, they received and evaluated a number of intelligence reports from several channels, on all parties that were involved including her family, her cousins, De Winter, Gagel, resistance members, the doctor, and others. They even made an attempt to obtain Lyon-Smith's report on her work at the WRNV. On 12 December 1945, MI5 interviewed Lyon-Smith. This was part of a larger investigative operation of the Red Orchestra.

During the interview, Lyon-Smith denied knowing anything about the Spaak's resistance activities. MI5 believed that Lyon-Smith was not as ignorant as she appeared, believing she would have enquired about the letter, about the destination, and what it was for. The agents also wondered why the Gestapo was so lenient. Lyon-Smith believed that it was her influence over Pannwitz, who she persuaded not to report her case to Berlin, that saved her. In a report that Pannwitz made to the CIA in 1959 on the history of the Sonderkommando Rote Kapelle, he stated that Lyon-Smith was a straight-forward honest girl, who would have found it impossible to refuse to help the Spaaks as her father was a Brigadier, and would have never known the true nature of the group's resistance work. Pannwitz described how he had tested her over several months to determine what her attitude to the Soviets and communism were, finding she was hostile to them. So based on her age and her attitude, he decided to release her. Certainly, Horst Kopkow would have known her name if there was anything illegal or untowards about her actions, but records do not show it. At the end of the interview, MI5 interrogators had no doubt that Lyon-Smith was withholding information and believed that she almost certainly told the Gestapo everything. In the intelligence report, in a letter from a Nazi source after the war it posits the fact that Lyon-Smith was not interned or jailed in a cell, but instead kept in nominal custody in the Sonderkommando offices in Paris. She was allowed a certain amount of freedom, doing little apart from making tea, listening to the radio or sewing.

Certainly in her biography, Lyon-Smith does say she visited the opera to view Die Fledermaus. However, she did not mention Pannwitz in the biography nor present a visage of somebody who was free to walk about the Sonderkommando offices, nor agreeing to marry Gagel. Gagel made two attempts to contact Lyon-Smith after the war but was unsuccessful.

On 20 June 1946, Lyon-Smith married David Ellis, a Lieutenant and the son of a Brigadier Richard Stanley Ellis CBE, MC at Symondsbury Church in Symondsbury. In 1947, Lyon-Smith's mother died. After the war, Lyon-Smith lived in Devon. The couple had a son, Roger Hunt.

== Death ==
Hunt died on 9 October 2010.
