= Medardo Griotto =

Italian activist (1901–1943)

- Medardo Griotto as a young man
- Born: 16 February 1901; Turin, Italy
- Died: 28 July 1943 (aged 42); Plötzensee Prison, Berlin, Nazi Germany
- Cause of death: Execution by guillotine
- Occupations: Mechanic, engraver
- Years active: 1923-1943
- Organization: Italian Communist Party
- Known for: Agent of a Soviet Red Orchestra ("Rote Kapelle")

Medardo Griotto (16 February 1901, Turin – 22 or 28 July 1943) was an Italian militant communist activist and member of the Italian Communist Party. Trained as a engraver, Griotto became an expert forger, who became an important member in the espionage network run by Communist International (Comintern) intelligence agent Henry Robinson. Griotto was betrayed by Leopold Trepper, arrested and executed by guillotine at Plötzensee Prison.

== Life ==
Griotto was the son of Giovanni Griotto and Maria Marguerite (née Perachiotti). Griotto married Anna Secco.

== Career ==
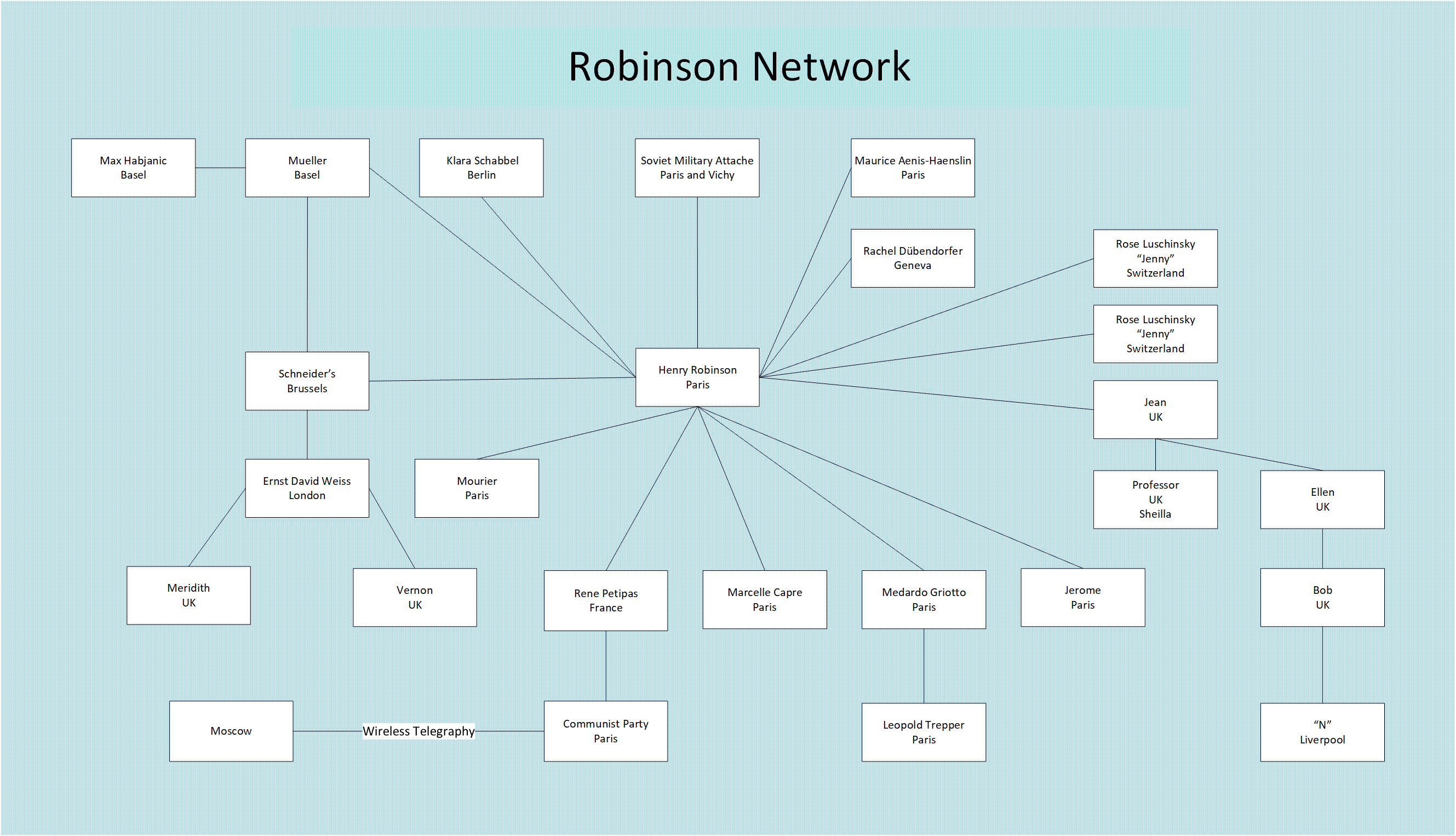
The espionage network of Henry Robinson that ran from 1937 to September 1941. Note that Griotto was the cutout between Robinson and Leopold Trepper who took over Robinson's network in 1937

As a young man Griotto became an engraver and owned a boutique shop in Turin. He became interested in communism and became a member of the Italian Communist Party and a militant communist agitator. After the Turin massacre in 1922 promogulated by the fascist state of Benito Mussolini, Griotto fearing for his life, took refuge in France in the early 1920s and then settled in Bezons. He became a member of the Confédération générale du travail unitaire trade union while working in the retail manufacturing workshops in the Asnières-sur-Seine area. After World War II started, Griotto joined the French Foreign Legion on 18 October 1939 and left in August 1940, two months after the French Armistice. In the spring of 1941, Griotto decided to resist by joining the National Front. In 1942, he joined the Francs-Tireurs et Partisans becoming a partisan.

== Espionage ==
From 1940 (perhaps before the outbreak of World War II) Griotto was an agent who worked for Henry Robinson, a Communist International (Comintern) agent. The first meeting between Trepper and Robinson took place in early September 1941 at the home of Anna Griotto. Both Robinson and later Trepper took advantage of the ability of Griotto to produce fake passports and identity document seals. Later he became Robinson's radio operator and one of his main assistants. Medardo's wife, Anna Griotto, also worked for Robinson. She served as a courier in Robinson's group in France and helped her husband in illegal work.

== Arrest ==
Griotto was directly betrayed by Trepper, who gave his address to Karl Giering of the Sonderkommando Rote Kapelle. Giering had Trepper phone Griotto to arrange a meeting for the 21 December 1942, with Robinson at the Palais de Chaillot in Paris, near his home, where he was to collect a message from Trepper. When Robinson approached the meeting he was arrested. Griotto was arrested the next day. Griotto's wife, Anna Griotto was betrayed by Abraham Rajchmann and was arrested in the Cafe de la Paix in Paris on the 12 October 1942 along with Malvina Gruber.

Both Griotto and Robinson were taken to Rue des Saussaies. Griotto was interned at Fresnes Prison. On the 11 March 1943, Griotto was tried at 62–64 Rue du Faubourg-Saint-Honoré in Paris by Luftwaffe Judge Manfred Roeder and sentenced to death. 74 members of the Soviet espionage group were tried over several days by Roeder. Griotto and his wife Anna were deported to Germany on a convoy that left from Compiègne on 15 April 1943. Griotto was taken to Plötzensee Prison where he was executed by guillotine on 22 July 1943. Anna was sent to Ravensbruck concentration camp and survived. After the war she cared for children at a nursery run by the Fiat company.
