= Fernand Pauriol =

French resistance fighter (1913–1944)

Fernand Pauriol when he was a young man

Fernand Baptistin Pauriol (13 September 1913 in Mallemort – 12 August 1944 in Fresnes) was a French communist, journalist and resistance fighter with the French Communist Party (PCF) during World War II. As a young man, Pauriol trained and worked as a sailor, later specialising in wireless telegraphy. Under the influence of his father, he became interested in communist politics and that led him to join the PCF. In the later interwar period, he swapped his maritime career for a career working underground in the PCF. When the war started, his skills in building radio transmitters enabled him to become the director of communications for the PCF on 2 March 1942 when he replaced Charly Villard and used the alias "Duval". He was eventually arrested by the Sonderkommando Rote Kapelle and shot.

== Life ==
Pauriol was born into a poor family of working class trades people. His father was a carpenter. As a child, he attended an upper primary school for boys in Aix-en-Provence. As a young man, Pauriol enrolled in the hydrography school in Marseille as a merchant marine cadet to train as a student sailing officer, with the aim of becoming a long distance captain. However, he had to leave his studies due to the cost. After leaving the school, Pauriol found a job as an accountant at the Marseille-based shipping company Compagnie Fraissinet. In 1930, he resumed his studies at the hydrography school and was certified a radio telegraphist in 1931.

Under his father's influence, Pauriol took an interest in politics, particularly communist politics. In 1921, his father been a member of the French Section of the Workers' International before moving to the French communist party (PCF). His father represented the PCF in the cantonal elections of October 1934. In 1930, Pauriol joined the Mouvement Jeunes Communistes de France, a political youth organisation of France that was close to the PCF. He spent a year in that communist youth organisation before joining the PCF itself as a fully fledged communist.

== Career ==
Pauriol began his career in radio telegraphy working for several months in the water and forestry service (Eaux et Forêts). In 1932, he was appointed to the position of coastal radio telegraphist sailor at the Compagnie Paquet shipping company in 1932, in a position he held until 1935. In the same year, he was conscripted into the French Navy while based at Toulon. During the same period, Pauriol was secretary of the PCF in Mallemort, for an appointment that lasted from October 1931 to October 1934, at the same time he was sailor. In the PCF, he worked for the colonial commission. While his ship was in port in North Africa, he would distribute communist leaflets in the local settlement. At some point Pauriol became a member of the Secours Rouge International (SRI), a Communist International organisation and became member of the SRI steering committee and leader of the Limoges congress. At the beginning of 1936, he was ordered to move to Marseille to provide the local SRI organisation a new orientation. He was appointed a communist instructor for the Bouches-du-Rhône, Var, Alpes-Maritimes departments. While he was working with SRI, Pauriol wrote a large number of articles for "Defense", the newspaper of SRI. In 1936, Pauriol joined the "Rouge-Midi", the weekly newspaper of the communist party in the Marseille region. On the 18 January 1936, Pauriol published an article in the "Rouge-Midi" that called on French communists to invest in the SRI to support the victims of capitalism and fascism. He described the operational requirements of the SRI organisation for the next year, stating that it needed at least 100000 members and commenting:

"These organizational results alone can make it possible to cope with the tasks of agitation, support, defense: Revision of the Luigi Bastoni trial, development of the Thaelmann campaign, support of strikers, workers arrested in protest struggles, assistance of proscribed anti-fascists."

In 1937, Pauriol talents as a journalist led François Billoux to appoint him as editor-in-chief of "Rouge-Midi". The next day, he represented the central committee of the PCF at the departmental conference of the SRI. Representatives of the Popular Front organizations were invited to the conference.

== World War II ==
At the beginning of the war, the communist parties in Europe needed to continue communications with parties in the Soviet Union, for example the Communist International (Comintern) and in this respect the PCF was no different. In 1938, Pauriol was evaluated twice by the executive committee of the PCF to prove his electrical engineering and radio telegraphist skills were up to par. When he was released from his conscription, he immediately went to work underground for the now banned PCF, using the new name of "Duval". He, along with this wife Hélène, led a permanent team of around twenty French and Spanish people, providing radio communications for the group. The PCF seconded Pauriol to a Soviet espionage network that was run in Europe by Leopold Trepper in February 1942. In April 1942, Pauriol constructed a radio transmitter that was used by Hersch and Miriam Sokol to provide a link to London for Trepper to transmit intelligence from an apartment in Maisons-Laffitte. The cipher clerk was Vera Ackermann. At the time this was only link between the Rote Kapelle in France and the Soviet Union.

=== Juliette affair ===
In May 1943, Pauriol was contacted via the PCF liaison agent Juliette Moussier who informed him that she had first been visited by Abraham Rajchmann and then later Hillel Katz. On both occasions, she had pretended she did not know them. The meeting with Moussier had been arranged by Gestapo officer Karl Giering of the Sonderkommando Rote Kapelle and was part of a German Funkspiel operation. Trepper was in custody of the Sonderkommando Rote Kapelle. Ostensibly the operation was to prove to Soviet intelligence that he was still free and enable the Funkspiel operation to continue, otherwise he would likely have been executed but in reality it was an operation by Trepper to pass a message to the PCF that confirmed the espionage network had collapsed. Trepper had instructed Moussier not to recognise anybody from the Trepper network except himself. On 10 May 1943, Trepper finally obtained permission from Karl Giering to meet with Moussier directly. In early June 1943, Trepper met Moussier and passed a message from Giering, supposedly from Trepper to inform Soviet Intelligence that the French Rote Kapelle was still functioning, as well his own report (Note: Treppers report survived and was found in 1990 in the archives of the Comintern. Bourgeois has analysed the report.) and a letter instructing Duclos to send the report to Soviet intelligence as soon as possible. After the meeting, Moussier went into hiding. During the summer Pauriol visited Moussier and her husband Milo in Beugne l'Abbe, west of Luçon and arranged for the couple to disappear.

On 7 July 1943 the first part of the message was transmitted to Soviet intelligence by Jacques Duclos. The second part followed on 10 July.

== Arrest ==
Giering knew about the existence of Pauriol from the V-Mann Abraham Rajchmann. (Note: V-Mann, short for Vertrauens-mann. (German:V-Mann, plural V-Leute). They were generally prisoners who agreed to work as undercover agents on pain of death, should they have refused.) When Moussier disappeared, he ordered the Sonderkommando Rote Kapelle to search for Pauriol all over France, but months past and there was no sign of him. Giering decided to adopt another approach and used the Funkspiel to request Soviet intelligence send them the name of a radio technician to repair Trepper's malfunctioning radio transmitter. The plan worked as they received the name of a Saint-Denis, Paris based repair technician, named Georges "JoJo" Vayssairat. Vayssairat was arrested and tortured, and became a V-Mann. Vayssairat exposed the name of Auguste. He was arrested and gave the name of Michel who was tortured for 12 days in Fresnes Prison before giving the name of an individual François who was hiding in Bordeaux. He was arrested by the Sonderkommando on 13 August 1943 during a meeting with Vayssairat and taken to Fresnes Prison. Pauriol was tortured for three weeks but choose to remain silent before eventually exposing his own identity as Pauriol. However, he never exposed any information on the Rote Kapelle or the PCF. The Sonderkommando discovered six storage locations in different areas of Paris during the investigation of Pauriol, with the main one located in a house in Longjumeau that contained all the modern equipment necessary to build radio transmitters.

== Death ==
On 19 January 1944, Pauriol was sentenced to death at a Luftwaffe court martial held in Paris by Judge Advocate Manfred Roeder. On 12 August 1944, he was shot in the yard of Fort Mont-Valérien and buried in the Cimetière parisien de Bagneux cemetery in Bagneux, Paris, alongside Suzanne Spaak who was shot on the same day by Gestapo officer, Heinz Pannwitz.
