= Francine Fromond =

Francine Fromond (2 October 1917 – 5 August 1944), known as Anna Frolova in the Soviet Union, was a member of the French Resistance during the Second World War who was captured by the Sonderkommando Rote Kapelle and executed at Fresnes Prison, aged 26.

== Early life ==
Fromond was born in the 19th arrondissement of Paris, the daughter of Albert Fromond, a mechanic who was killed in 1932 during a protest march against unemployment, and his wife, Germaine Pointeau. With her mother, a dressmaker, Francine Fromond grew up in Les Lilas, where her brother, Marcel, became secretary of the local branch of Young Communists. Having obtained her Certificat d'études primaires (CEP), she was forced to leave school at the age of thirteen to work in a shop, then became a shorthand-typist.

== Communist activities ==
In 1933 she joined the Union des jeunes filles de France (UJFF), and quickly took a leading role. In 1935, she was selected to join a delegation to Moscow, where she entered the International Leninist School under the pseudonym of Madeleine Dupuy. In 1936 she became an assistant to Giulio Ceretti, a Communist agent who worked under the pseudonym of "Pierre Allard", using a company called France-Navigation to give assistance to the Republican faction in the Spanish Civil War. In 1939, when the company was closed down, she was involved in a clandestine mission to recover the company documents.

== Second World War ==
Later in 1939, Fromond went to Belgium to work for the Czech Communist leader Eugen Fried. She was then sent to Denmark to liaise with Giulio Ceretti, and was arrested in May 1940 but was freed after a few weeks as a result of Soviet diplomatic intervention, and returned to the Soviet Union. Towards the end of 1941 she was sent to the UK, where she received parachute training. Along with Raymond Guyot and Daniel Georges, she was parachuted into France in January 1942, on a mission codenamed "Rum". She arrived near Montpellier, where she was to set up a radio station, with the assistance of her own mother and another Resistance worker, Joséphine Turin, codenamed "Fifi".

On 30 July 1943 all three women were arrested by the Sonderkommando Rote Kapelle and sent to Fresnes Prison, where Francine's mother, Germaine, died as a result of ill-treatment. Fromond and Turin were tortured by the Gestapo at Lyon but revealed nothing. They were sent to Paris and then to Lyon for trial, and were executed on the same day in 1944, a short time before the country was liberated.

== Legacy ==
During a post-war search for Fromond's body and effects, it was discovered that she had been married to another Resistance worker, Maurice Velzland, but had left him because he was considered untrustworthy; he had subsequently been shot. Schools in Bagnolet, Aubervilliers, Drancy and Fresnes are named after her, as well as a street in Les Lilas.

Fromond commemorated on Tempsford Memorial in Bedfordshire, UK under her Soviet name Anna Frolova.
