= Isidore Springer =

French Red Orchestra agent

Isidore Springer (23 July 1912 in Antwerp, 27 December 1942 in Lyon, France) was a Belgian diamond dealer and communist who became an important member of the Red Orchestra organisation in Belgium and later France during World War II. Springer worked as a recruiter and courier between Leopold Trepper, a Soviet agent who was the technical director of Soviet espionage in Western Europe, and Anatoly Gurevich, also a Soviet agent, in Belgium. He would later run the 6th network of Trepper's seven espionage networks in France, providing intelligence from US and Belgian diplomats. His aliases were Romeo, Verlaine, Walter van Vliet, Fred and Sabor.

== Life ==
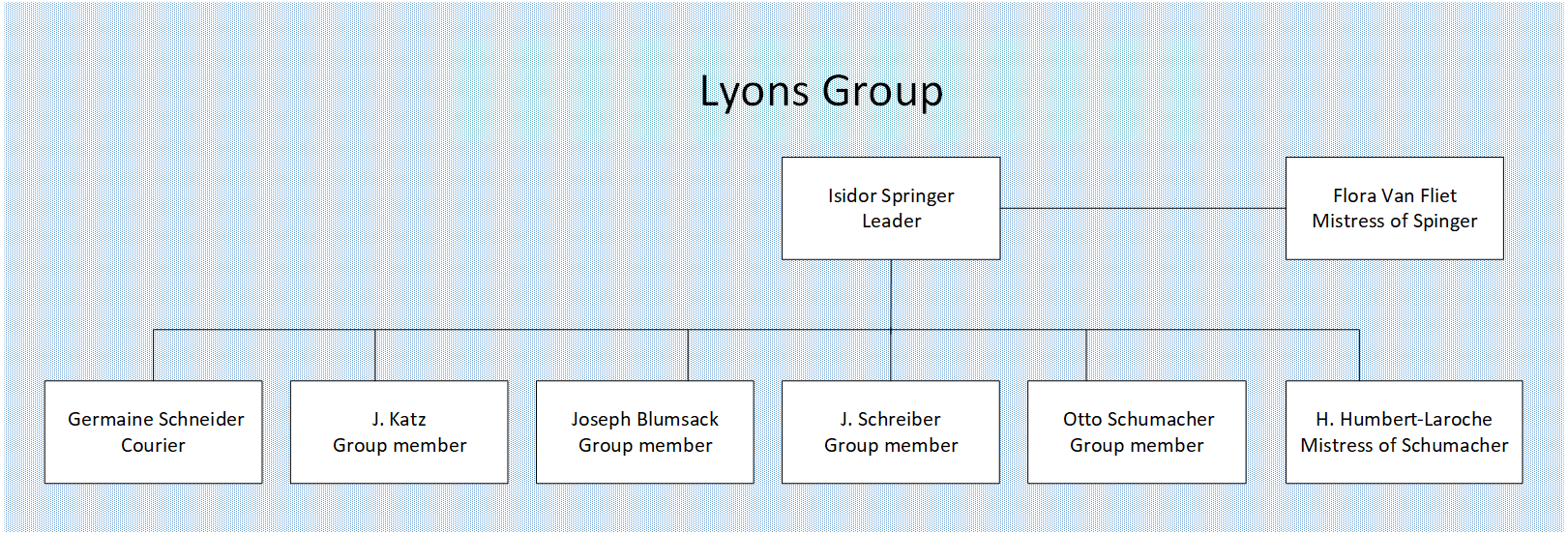
Diagram of the Lyons or "Romeo" group that Springer led. This was the 6th of Trepper's seven networks in France.

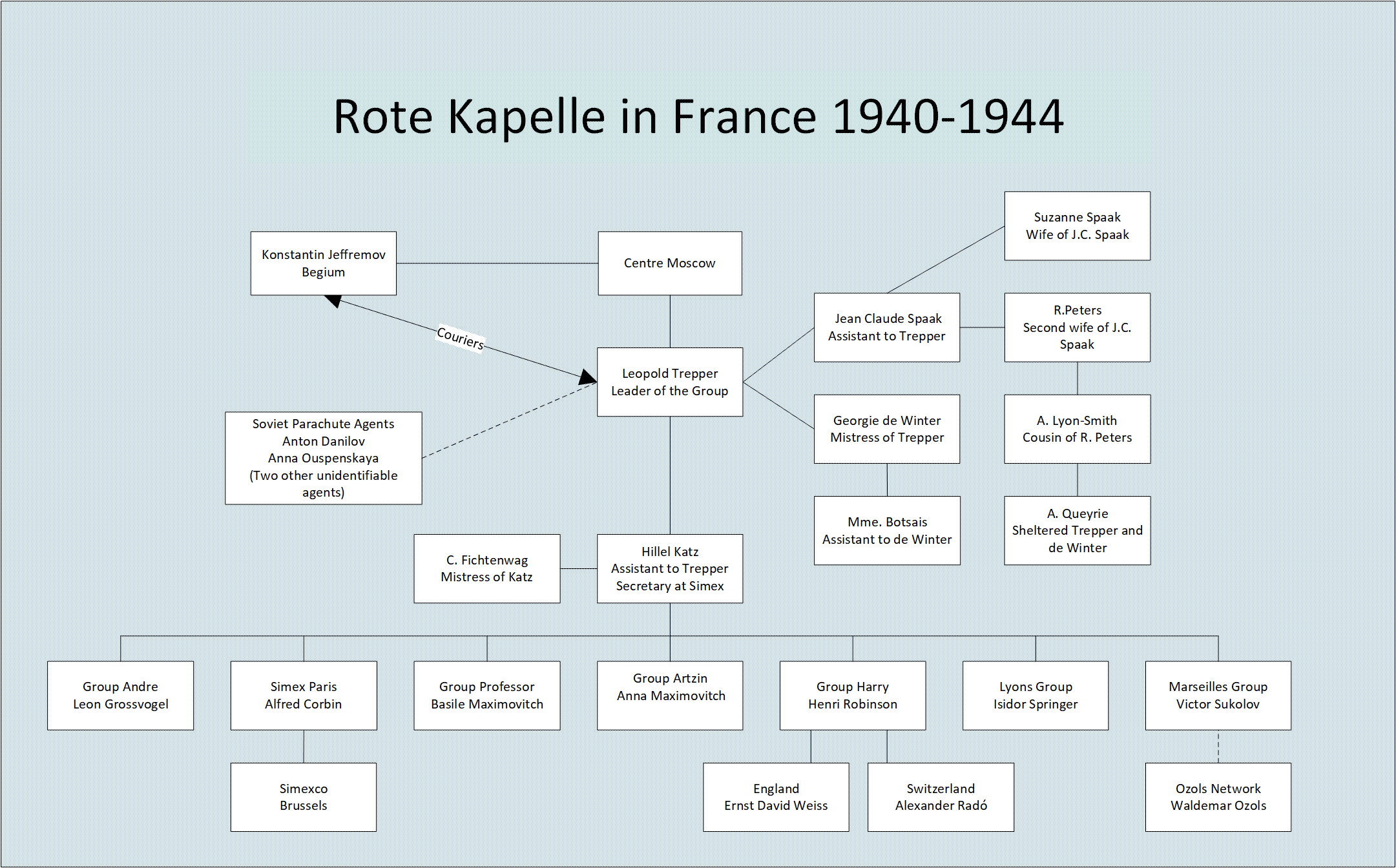
Red Orchestra in France 1940-1944

Springer's father was Simon Springer and his mother was Lona Kunstlinger Springer. His mistress was Rita Arnould. His wife was Flore Valaerts who was a dance teacher who held a dance class on Rue Royale in Brussels. Valaerts was active in the World Committee Against War and Fascism and was a member of the Communist Party of Belgium. She collaborated with her husband as a member of the Ger codename was Flora Van Fliet and she provided a range of services to the GRU including using her dance class a mail drop location for the network.

== Career ==
Between 1930 and 1931, Springer lived in Paris. According to Willy Berg, the member of the Sonderkommando Rote Kapelle who interrogated Springer after he was arrested, worked for Trepper before the outbreak of World War II, liaising with the Soviet Embassy when Trepper was away.

In 1938, Springer moved to Belgium and became an active member of the espionage network run by Anatoly Gurevich. Springer fought against fascist forces in Spain from 1937-1938. Springer ran the 6th network of Trepper's 7 networks in Europe, supplying intelligence garnered from US and Belgian diplomats. He was also as a recruiter and a courier between Gurevich in Brussels and Trepper in Paris. After the raid at 101 Rue des Atrébates by the Funkabwehr on 12 December 1941, Mikhail Makarov was arrested, Springer fled to Paris with Gurevich on 15 December 1941. Springer was sent to Lyon by Trepper where he attempted to establish a new espionage network. However, Springer failed to establish a wireless telegraphy link with Moscow.

== Arrest and death ==
Springer was arrested on 19 December 1942 and sent to Fresnes Prison. He committed suicide on 24 December 1942. His wife Flore Valaerts was sent to Plötzensee Prison where she was guillotined on 20 August 1943. She had received the death sentence as she has used her dance class in Rue Royale in Brussels as a mail drop for the espionage network.
