= Mithridate Network =

French resistance network

The Mithridate resistance network (French: Réseau Mithridate), founded in June 1940 by Pierre Herbinger at the request of the British intelligence service MI6, was one of the most significant resistance networks of World War II. It gathered more than 1,600 agents spread across the entire French territory, Belgium, and northern Italy.

Although a Franco-British network, Mithridate was only attached to the French Central Bureau of Intelligence and Operations (BCRA) in January 1942. It was a military intelligence network responsible for providing the necessary information to the general staffs to precede or accompany wartime operations.

The network remained operational until 1945. It included 1,987 accredited agents, of whom 127 died for France and 208 were deported but returned alive. Four of its members were made Companions of the Liberation: André Aalberg, Laure Diebold, Pierre-Jean Herbinger, and François Binoche.
