= Horst Kopkow =

German Nazi politician (1910–1996)

Horst Kopkow (29 November 1910, Ortelsburg, East Prussia, Germany (now Szczytno, Poland) – 13 October 1996, Gelsenkirchen, Germany) was a Nazi German SS major who worked for German Security police and, after the war, was concealed by British intelligence to use his knowledge during the Cold War.

== Life ==
During World War II, Kopkow served in German National Security Headquarters (Reichssicherheitshauptamt) in Berlin. He was responsible for counter-sabotage and counterespionage. In May 1942, SS general Reinhard Heydrich extended his responsibilities to include the capture of Soviet parachute agents in Czechoslovakia and Poland. After Heydrich's death following a British-directed Czech resistance attack, Kopkow's responsibilities were extended to include all allied parachute agents in the German Reich.

During the war, Kopkow's agents captured several hundred Soviet and British agents. Kopkow was informed and consulted over every capture, although he never left his headquarters in Berlin. One of his major efforts was the destruction of Red Orchestra and Rote Drei espionage networks. Security police also captured agents of MI6 and SOE. Kopkow authorized several hundred orders to execute the agents. This continued to the end of the war in 1945. His superiors rewarded him with medals. Kopkow also investigated the 20 July plot, an attempted assassination against Hitler.

At the end of the war, British military police arrested Kopkow in a Baltic spa village of Dahme on 29 May 1945. By that time he would have been implicated in deaths of hundreds of Allied agents.

MI5 interrogated Kopkow heavily for the next four years to find out his methods against Soviet Union espionage. Kopkow cooperated and dictated notes to his former secretary Bertha Rose. British intelligence sheltered him from war crimes investigation and made him available only for three times in war crimes trials. They announced his "death" to War Crimes Group in London in January 1948. According to partially declassified MI5 documents released 2004 in the British National Archives, MI6 hid Kopkow in order to utilize his knowledge further. They released him in West Germany in 1949 or 1950 as a textile factory worker in the British occupation zone. Later he gave just two statements to the West German police when they were investigating the disappearance and death of Gestapo chief Heinrich Müller.

Horst Kopkow died from pneumonia in a hospital in Gelsenkirchen in 1996, aged 85.
