= Suzanne Spaak =

Belgian anti-Nazi resistance worker and counterintelligence agent

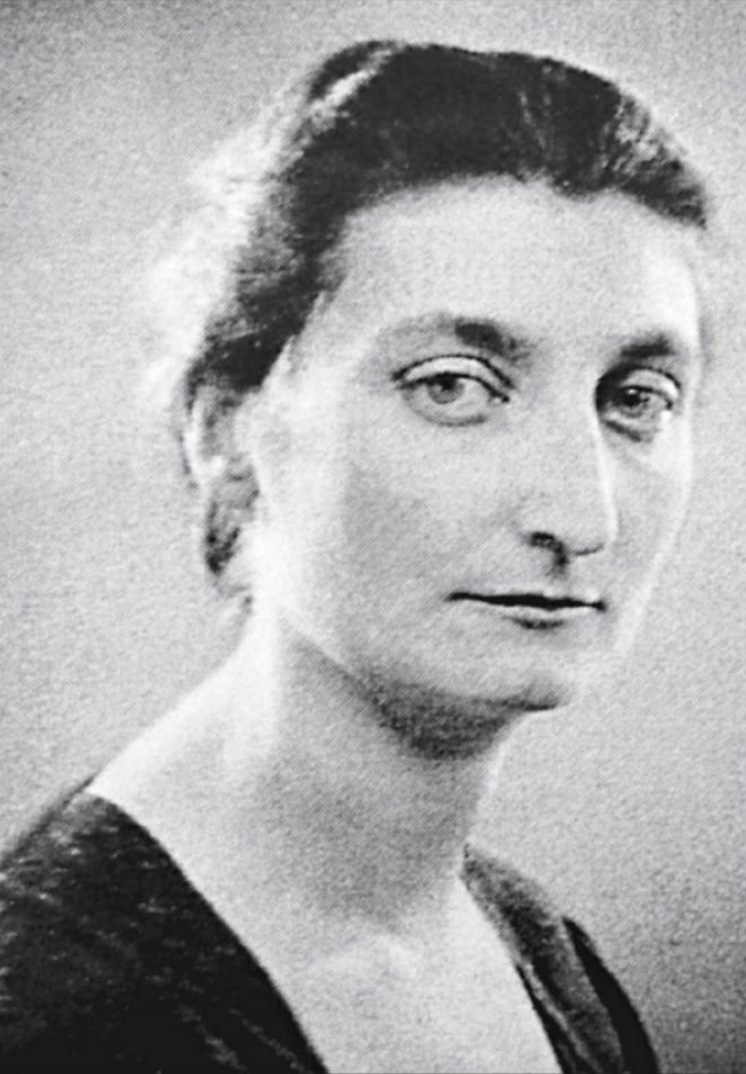
- Portrait of Suzanne Spaak date unknown.
- Born: 6 July 1905; Brussels, Belgium
- Died: 12 August 1944 (aged 39); Fresnes Prison, Fresnes, German-occupied France
- Cause of death: Execution by shooting

Suzanne Spaak, née Suzanne Augustine Lorge known as Suzette Spaak (6 July 1905 – 12 August 1944) was a World War II French Resistance operative. On 21 April 1985, Yad Vashem recognized Spaak as Righteous Among the Nations, for helping to smuggle several Jewish children to safety, by providing them with ration cards and clothing.

== Life ==
Spaak was born in Brussels into a prosperous Belgian banking family in 1905. She married Brussels-born dramatist Claude Spaak (1904-1990), brother of both Charles Spaak, a screenwriter, and Paul-Henri Spaak, a Belgian statesman who was one of first leaders of the European Communities. Living in Paris with her husband and two children, Lucie known affectionately as Pilette and Paul-Louis as Bazou, she enjoyed a life of luxury and prestige as one of the city's leading socialites. Her husband had acquired paintings by their fellow Belgian, René Magritte, and in 1936, Magritte painted her portrait. Her lifestyle changed drastically with the onslaught of World War II and the subsequent occupation of France by Germany.

== French Resistance ==
Angry with the suppression, brutality and racial intolerance of the Nazis, she volunteered to work with the underground National Movement Against Racism (MNCR).

With time and growing atrocities by the Nazis, Spaak devoted herself to ridding France and her native Belgium of its oppressors. She joined the Red Orchestra intelligence network, a Soviet-sponsored organization founded by a Polish Jew, Leopold Trepper.

This group conducted very effective intelligence gathering in Germany, France, Belgium and Netherlands. The network became so successful, even infiltrating the German military intelligence service Abwehr, that the Nazis set up the "Red Orchestra Special Detachment" (Sonderkommando Rote Kapelle) to destroy it.

A mother of two, Spaak worked doggedly to save the lives of Jewish children who were facing deportation to the German death camps. In early 1943, she was part of a group that saved 163 Jewish children who were about to be deported from the Union générale des israélites de France (UGIF) centers. At enormous risk to herself and her family, she hid some of the children in her own home, helping to provide the children with clothing and ration cards and arranging for them be moved to the safety of homes of people in various parts of France willing to risk hiding them.

== Arrest ==
In Belgium, in the spring of 1942, the Germans traced and monitored Red Orchestra radio transmitters and made their first arrests of Red Orchestra agents. Captured members were brutally tortured and several broke, divulging network secrets that, over the ensuing eighteen months, allowed for more than 600 people to be arrested. On 9 November 1943, Spaak was arrested in Brussels. In October 1943, she was sent by the Gestapo to the prison in Fresnes in Paris where she was kept in horrific conditions and subjected to torture.

When the Allied forces broke through at Normandy and began to fight their way to free Paris, the Gestapo prepared to flee but before they did, they began executing certain prisoners.

On 12 August 1944, just thirteen days before the liberation of Paris, Spaak was shot by the Gestapo officer, Heinz Pannwitz in her cell. She was 39 years old. On 21 April 1985, Yad Vashem recognized Suzanne Spaak as Righteous Among the Nations.
