= Abraham Rajchmann =

Career criminal

- Jewish forger Abraham Rajchmann
- Born: 24 September 1902; Dziurków, Poland
- Occupations: Forger, engraver
- Years active: 1934–1946
- Known for: Soviet Red Orchestra ("Rote Kapelle") in Belgium and France.

Abraham Rajchmann (born 24 September 1902) was a Jewish Polish career criminal and revolutionary militant, (Note: Perrault refers to Rajchmann as Raichman in his publications) expert forger and engraver who worked for Soviet intelligence from 1934. Through his contact with Comintern official Léon Grossvogel, he was recruited into a Soviet espionage group initially in Belgium that was being run by Leopold Trepper, that would later be called the Red Orchestra ("Rote Kapelle") by the Abwehr, during the Nazi period. Rajchmann used a number of aliases to disguise his identity, including Adam Blanssi, Arthur Roussel, Katenmann, Fabrikant and Max.

== Communist ==
Rajchmann was a member of the Communist International (Comintern) Pass-Apparat, an industrial scale identity document forging operation, that was started in Berlin in 1919–1920 and eventually had offices all over Europe.

For much of the 1930s, Rajchmann worked as an agent for the Comintern. In 1937, Rajchmann was contacted by Léon Grossvogel, to request he obtain several Polish passports and to accompany several Jewish refugees to the consulate to act as interpreter, in their application for passports.

== Trepper network ==
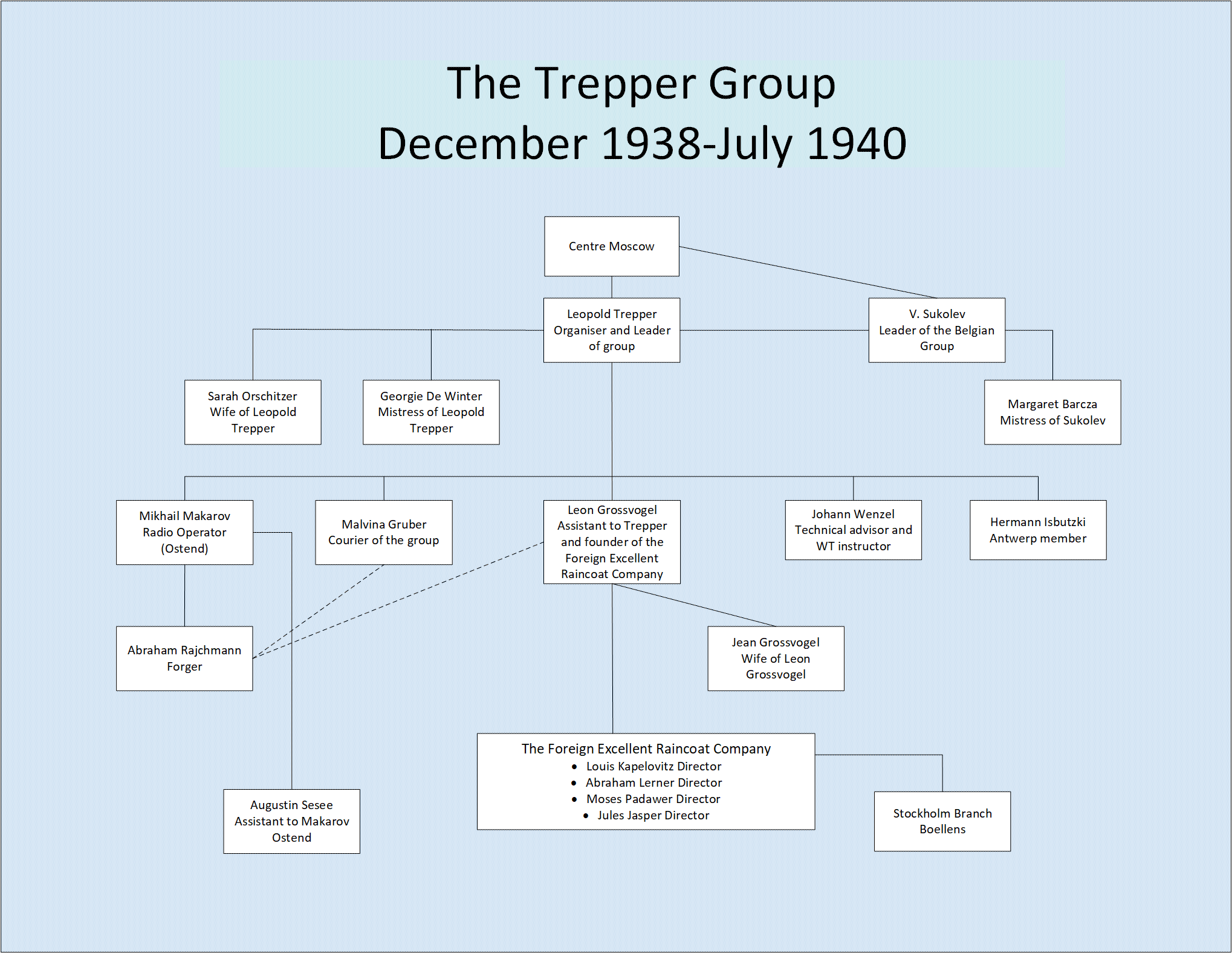
Diagram of the Trepper Group in Belgium. Rajchmann who was trusted by Trepper as forger but not as a man, was subordinate to Makarov

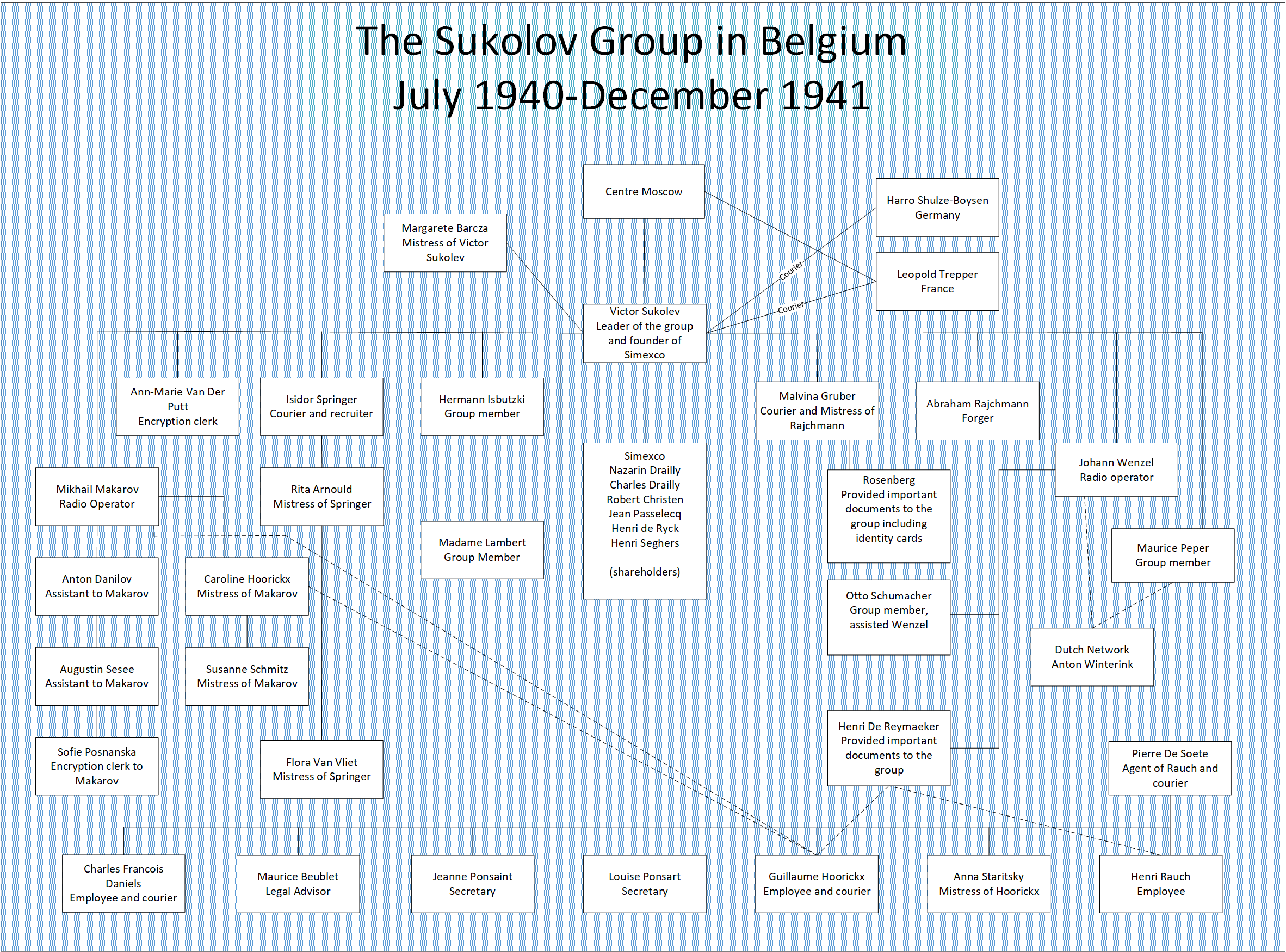
Diagram of the Sukolov Group that was run by Soviet agent, Anatoly Gurevich. Rajchmann provided identity documents for the group working out of a secret room at 101 Rue des Atrebates

In the spring 1939, Rajchmann was recruited by Grossvogel into working for a resistance group in Brussels, that was in reality a Soviet espionage group that was being that was run by Soviet agent Leopold Trepper.

Rajchmann was introduced to Trepper, who used a codename to disguise his identity. Trepper informed him that his main function would be to act as an expert on the validity of certain documents and that a liaison would be arranged between himself and Rajchmann, that would be arranged through Soviet GRU officer Mikhail Makarov. When Rajchmann was recruited, Makarov was relieved of the responsibility of producing forged documents.

On 16 September 1939, Rajchmann was arrested and interned in Saint-Gilles prison. When he was released in October, he contacted Trepper who reprimanded him for being interned and ordered him to prepare a new identity. Trepper had high regard for Rajchmann, the forger, but little regard for Rajchmann, the man. He felt that Rajchmann was conceited, foolhardy, and too quick to show contempt. Rajchmann told Trepper that he was relatively well known in Brussels, so a new identity would be useless. They both agreed that Rajchmann should hide in a quiet house with a garden where the Soviet agents could visit him, in private.

For the next six months, Rajchmann worked for Trepper organising passports and visas. Toward the spring of 1940, Trepper admitted to Rajchmann that he worked for Soviet intelligence and the work was directed against Germany. For Rajchmann, whose entire family had been killed during the Invasion of Poland, in September–October 1939, it was welcome news, as it enabled him to strike back at the Germans.

== Escape ==
At the start of the German invasion of Belgium on 10 May 1940, Rajchmann went into hiding with a friend. After advising his wife who was staying at her parents house at 32 Avenue Jean Volders in Saint-Gilles to flee to France, Rajchmann took a train with his father-in-law and brother-in-law out of Belgium. His brother alighted at Tournai, while they both continued travelling to Montréjeau. When Rajchmann arrived in Montréjeau, he was interned at the Saint-Cyprien internment camp. His father, who was not arrested, went to stay in Revel in Haute-Garonne. The Saint-Cyprien internment camp was established on the 8 February 1939 at Saint-Cyprien coastal strip in Rosellón along with several other internment camps in the same location. Its main purpose was the hold Republican prisoners who were fleeing the Republican defeat at Barcelona on 26 January 1939. By March 1939, it held 90,000 prisoners.

After the French armistice of 22 June 1940, Rajchmann went through processing and was released in July–August 1940 and later met his father in Revel. In August 1940 he was contacted by Trepper who ordered him to travel to Toulouse where he would meet Comintern agent and courier Malvina Gruber, who would escort him back to Brussels to continue to provide documentation support to the Soviet espionage group there.

In September or October 1940, Rajchmann met Gruber and they crossed the demarcation line in Bordeaux. Rajchmann left Gruber to meet his wife in Paris at the Caron Hotel in The Marais. At the hotel, Rajchmann met up with Bob Isbutzki (Hermann Isbutzki), who arranged for Rajchmann to meet Trepper, who ordered him to travel back to Brussels to continue his work providing identity documents for the group.

== Sukolov network ==
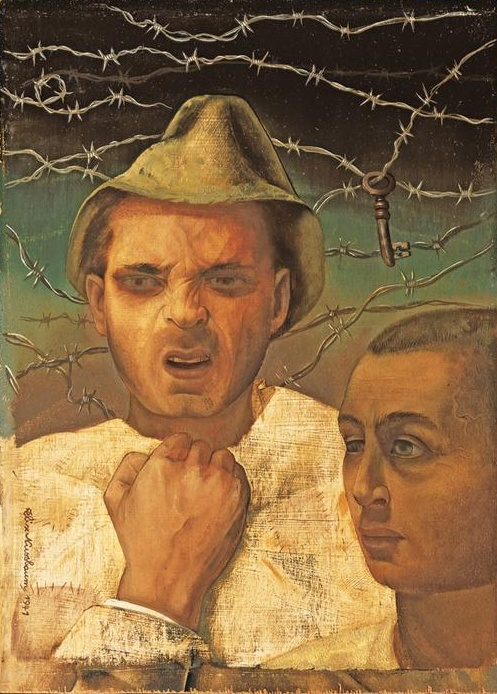
Self-Portrait of the German-Jewish surrealist Felix Nussbaum who was also interred in Camp St. Cyprien. He painted this while he was on the run in Belgium after escaping

In April 1941 in Brussels, Rajchmann was met by Makarov who told him that point onwards he would be expected to take part in the fight against the Germans. In September or October 1941, Trepper ordered Rajchmann to join Soviet agent Anatoly Gurevich, who operated from a safehouse located at 101 Rue des Atrébates in Brussels. Gurevich used Makarov as his wireless radio operator, Sophia Poznańska as his cipher clerk, Rita Arnould as a courier and housekeeper, and Isidor Springer, who worked as a courier between Gurevich and Trepper and as a recruiter.

Rajchmann supplied identity documents for Makarov as well as a list of people who were wanted by the German authorities. Rajchmann contacted Chief Inspector Charles Mathieu of the Belgian Police Judiciaire des Parquets to obtain the list. Unknown to Rajchmann, Mathieu was a penetration agent, who were known in Germany as a V-Mann that was short for Vertrauens-mann. (German:V-Mann, plural V-Leute). They were generally prisoners who agreed to work as undercover agents on pain of death, should they have refused. Mathieu reported the request to Abwehr officer Harry Piepe.

== Discovery ==
On 26 June 1941, the Funkabwehr intercepted a number of radio messages. It took some months of work for the Funkabwehr to identify where the transmitter was located, but on 30 November 1941 the close range direction-finding teams moved into Brussels and almost immediately found three transmitter signals. The Abwehr choose a location at 101 Rue des Atrébates, that provided the strongest signal and on 12 December 1941 at 2 pm, the house was raided by the Abwehr. Everybody inside the house was arrested. By chance Rajchmann was absent from the apartment, when it was raided. The Funkabwehr found the secret room that Rajchmann used to forge documents, that contained blank passports and inks. Trepper happened to be in Brussels at the time, found out and warned Gurevich of the raid, managing to evade arrest.

In late December 1941, or early 1941, Rajchmann again met Bob Isbutzki, who introduced him to Gurevich. Gurevich arranged travel documents with Rajchmann for Gurvich's wife Greta Barcza and his son, so they could flee Belgium. Rajchmann arranged for Malvina Gruber to escort Barcza and her son to Paris, where they were then escorted by another courier to the non-occupied zone. Gurevich also requested that Rajchmann find a hiding place for the radio transmitter the group had been using at the apartment. Rajchmann suggest using the home of Chief Inspector Mathieu on 65 Avenue des Tilleuls in Brussels; the transfer was arranged in January 1942, via Bob Isbutzki. During a further meeting with Isbutzki, it was arranged that Rajchmann should meet Trepper in Paris, either in the Cafe Boule d'Or or Boule d'Argent, located close to the Saint-Michel metro station. In the meeting Rajchmann was informed that Konstantin Jeffremov would be his new direct superior.

== Jeffremov network ==
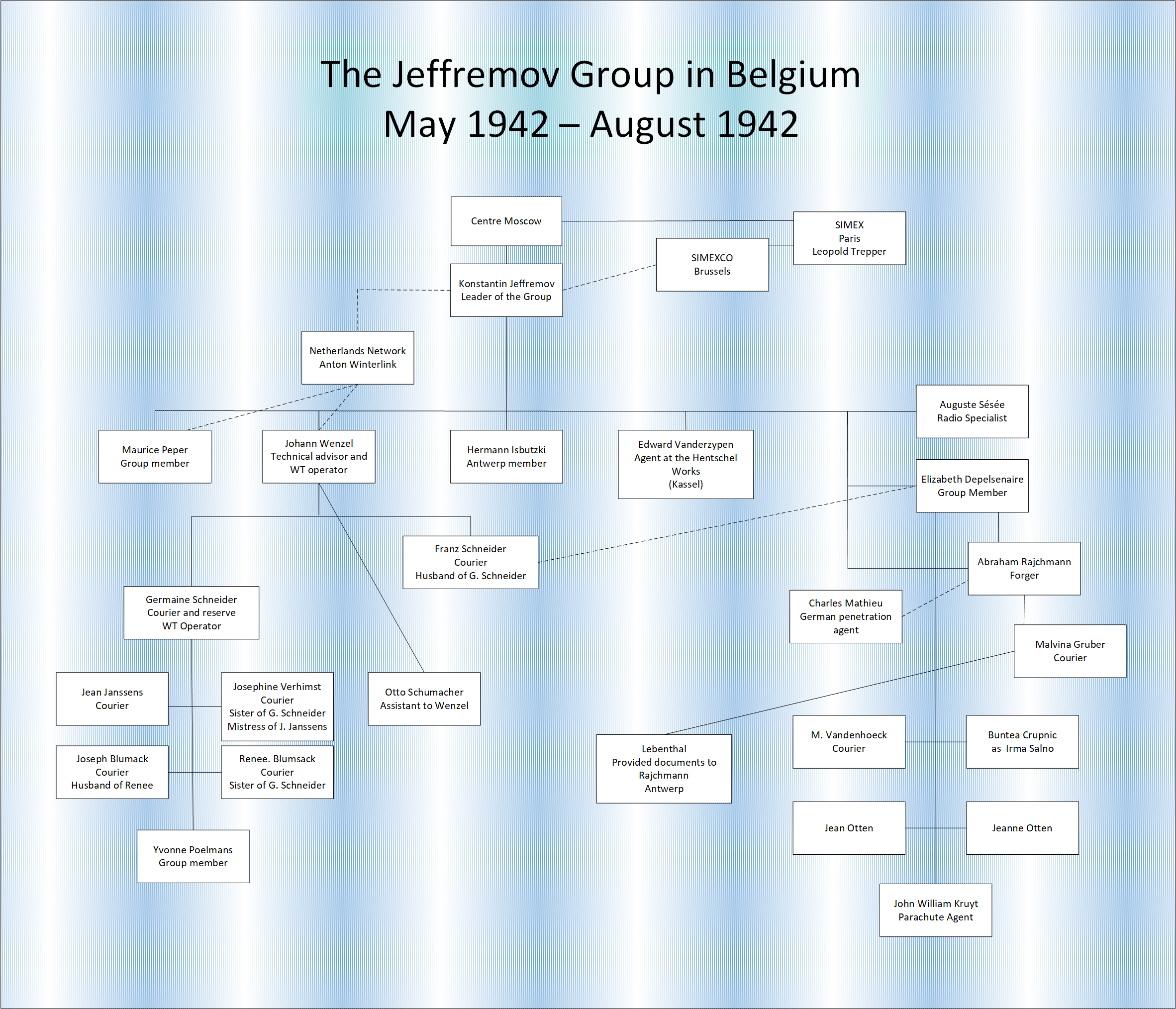
The Jeffremov Group, May 1942 - August 1942 in Belgium

Rajchmann's first operation was to create a new identity for Trepper under the name of Gilbert. Trepper insisted the seals should be authentic, so Rajchmann met a contact in Antwerp who provided the seals as well as certificates of good conduct. For the next year, Rajchmann provided documents for a number of people in the group.

On 30 July 1942, the Funkabwehr identified a second safehouse at 12 Rue de Namur, Brussels that was being used by Jeffremov's group and several members of the group were arrested. Trepper managed to warn Jeffremov who managed to escape and went into hiding. Trepper instructed him to create a new identity for himself, so Jeffremov turned to Rajchmann who used his contact, Mathieu to source blank identity cards. The process that Mathieu used was to send a formal written request to a local administration that had been bombed or destroyed and would request the name of a certain person at a certain address. The administration would answer back that the records were unavailable, except to inform Mathieu that the address still existed. Mathieu would then be able to deliver a blank identity card that would be filled in with that address. Mathieu reported the matter to the Abwehr. Rajchmann arranged with Jeffremov to pick the new identity cards up from Mathieu on 30 July 1942, at the middle of the bridge overhanging the Botanical Garden of Brussels in Brussels. Jeffremov was arrested by the Gestapo.

== Arrest ==
On 2 September 1942, Rajchmann had a meeting with Mathieu at the Cafe Isy, Avenue de la Porte de Hal, in Brussels to obtain the forged identity papers for himself and was arrested by Piepe. He was taken to Fort Breendonk where he was tortured for three days. He decided to cooperate with the Abwehr resulting in his betrayal of his mistress, Malvina Gruber, who was arrested on 12 October 1942.

On 28 October 1942, Rajchmann was taken back to Brussels where he met Gestapo officer Karl Giering, who led the Sonderkommando Rote Kapelle, a special commission established by the Gestapo and the Abwehr to capture members of the Red Orchestra. Rajchmann was informed he would be allowed free movement but would still be considered a prisoner. After signing a statement saying he would cooperate, he was released on parole to return home.

== Paris ==
Piepe and Giering agreed that Rajchmann would be the best person to take to Paris to find Trepper. once the Belgian investigation of the Red Orchestra by the Sonderkommando Rote Kapelle was completed. In January or February 1943, Rajchmann and Gruber were told that they would be moving to Paris. When they arrived, Giering sent Rajchmann out to visit all the dead letterboxes that he knew about, while leaving a message to Trepper to contact him. However, Trepper never showed up.

== After the war ==
On the 26 July 1946, Rajchmann was arrested by Belgian police and tried by a Military tribunal who sentenced him to twelve years in prison for espionage. He was released on 7 June 1956. In 1960, a report was created by a NATO Special Committee that stated that Rajchmann was living at 32 Avenue Jean Voiders, St Gilles, Belgium.

== Bibliography ==
- Brysac, Shareen Blair (2000). Resisting Hitler: Mildred Harnack and the Red Orchestra. New York: Oxford University Press. ISBN 978-0-19-513269-4.
- Kesaris, Paul. L, ed. (1979). The Rote Kapelle: the CIA's history of Soviet intelligence and espionage networks in Western Europe, 1936–1945 (pdf). Washington DC: University Publications of America. ISBN 978-0-89093-203-2.
- Perrault, Gilles (1969). The Red Orchestra. New York: Schocken Books. ISBN 0-8052-0952-2.
