= Malvina Gruber =

Slovak courier of the Red Orchestra

- Born: Malvina Hofstadterová; 6 December 1900; Žabokreky nad Nitrou, Slovakia, Austria-Hungary
- Occupations: cutout and courier
- Years active: 1939–1942
- Organization(s): Communist International, Red Orchestra
- Known for: Member of the Red Orchestra

Malvina Gruber, née Hofstadterová (born 6 December 1900), was a Slovak Jewish Comintern agent, who was part of a Soviet intelligence network in Belgium and France, that was later called the Red Orchestra ("Rote Kapelle") by the Abwehr, during Nazi regime. Gruber worked as a cutout, but her specialism was couriering people across borders. From 1938 to 1942, Gruber worked as assistant to Soviet agent Abraham Rajchmann, a forger, who provided identity papers, e.g. the Kennkarte, Carte d'identité and travel permits, for the espionage group. At the beginning of 1942, she was arrested in Brussels by the Abwehr.

== Life ==
Malvina Gruber, née Hofstadterová, was born in Žabokreky nad Nitrou. She was married to the Czech-Hungarian Adolphe Gruber and had six children. Her husband Adolphe had been a businessman in Czechoslovakia but fled to Britain as a Jewish refugee in 1939 via Belgium.

== World War II ==
=== Trepper group ===
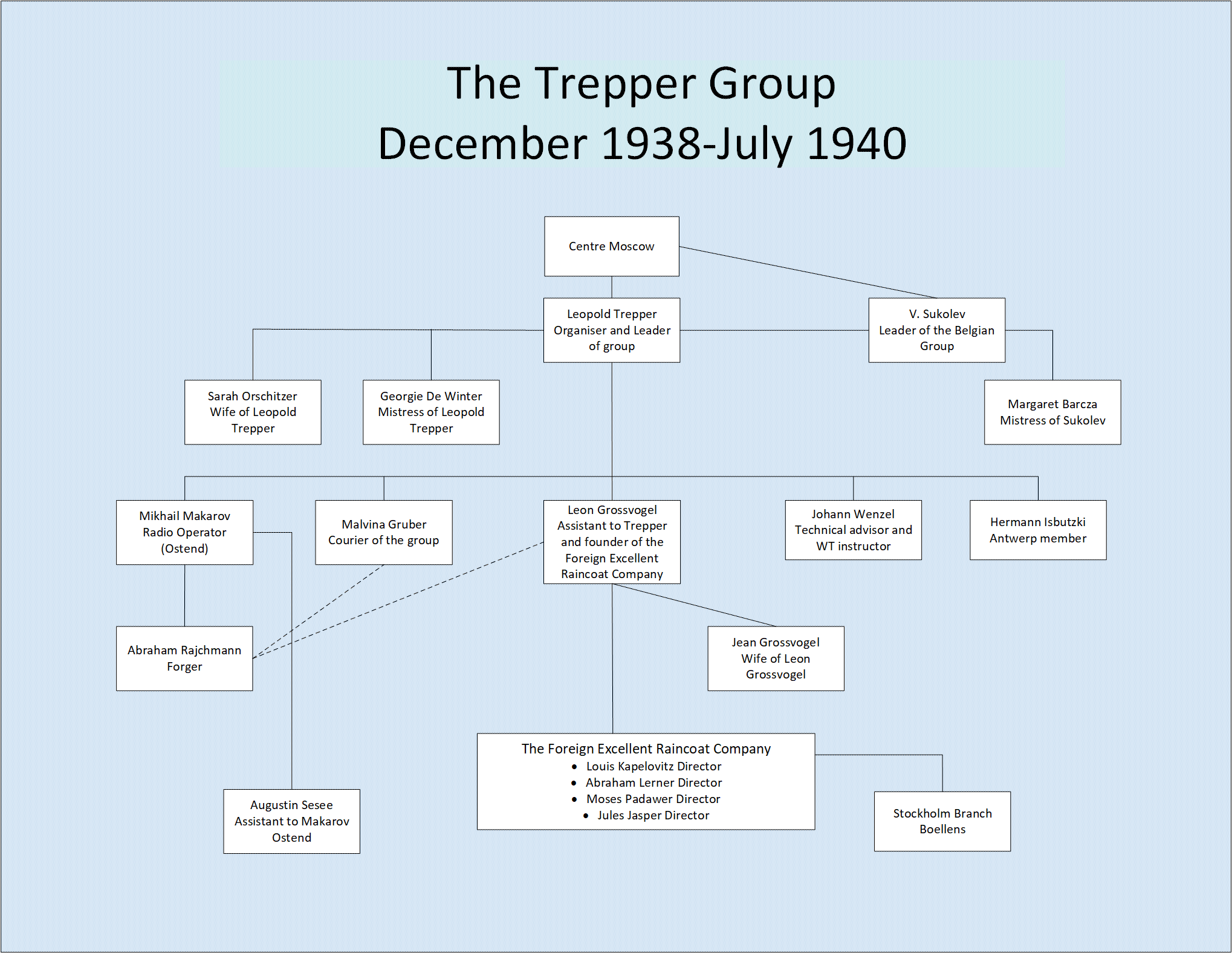
Diagram of the Trepper Group in Belgium between December 1938 and July 1940

In 1939, Gruber was recruited by Leopold Trepper who was the leader of a Soviet espionage group in Europe.

In May 1940, after the occupation of Belgium, Gruber worked as a courier between Leopold Trepper in Paris and Rajchmann in Brussels. In July 1941, Gruber escorted Soviet agent and secret writing specialist Anton Danilov from France to Belgium where he became part of the espionage network run by Anatoly Gurevich. In October 1941, she escorted Ann-Marie Van Der Putt, from Brussels to Paris to work for Trepper. Van Der Putt had been trained by Gurevich in enciphering/deciphering procedures. On the way back, Gruber escorted Sophia Poznańska back to Brussels. In 1941, Gruber escorted Greta Barcza, the wife of Gurevich and her son to Paris. According to Gruber, during the period 1941–1942, she crossed the Swiss border ninety-eight times.

=== Arrest ===
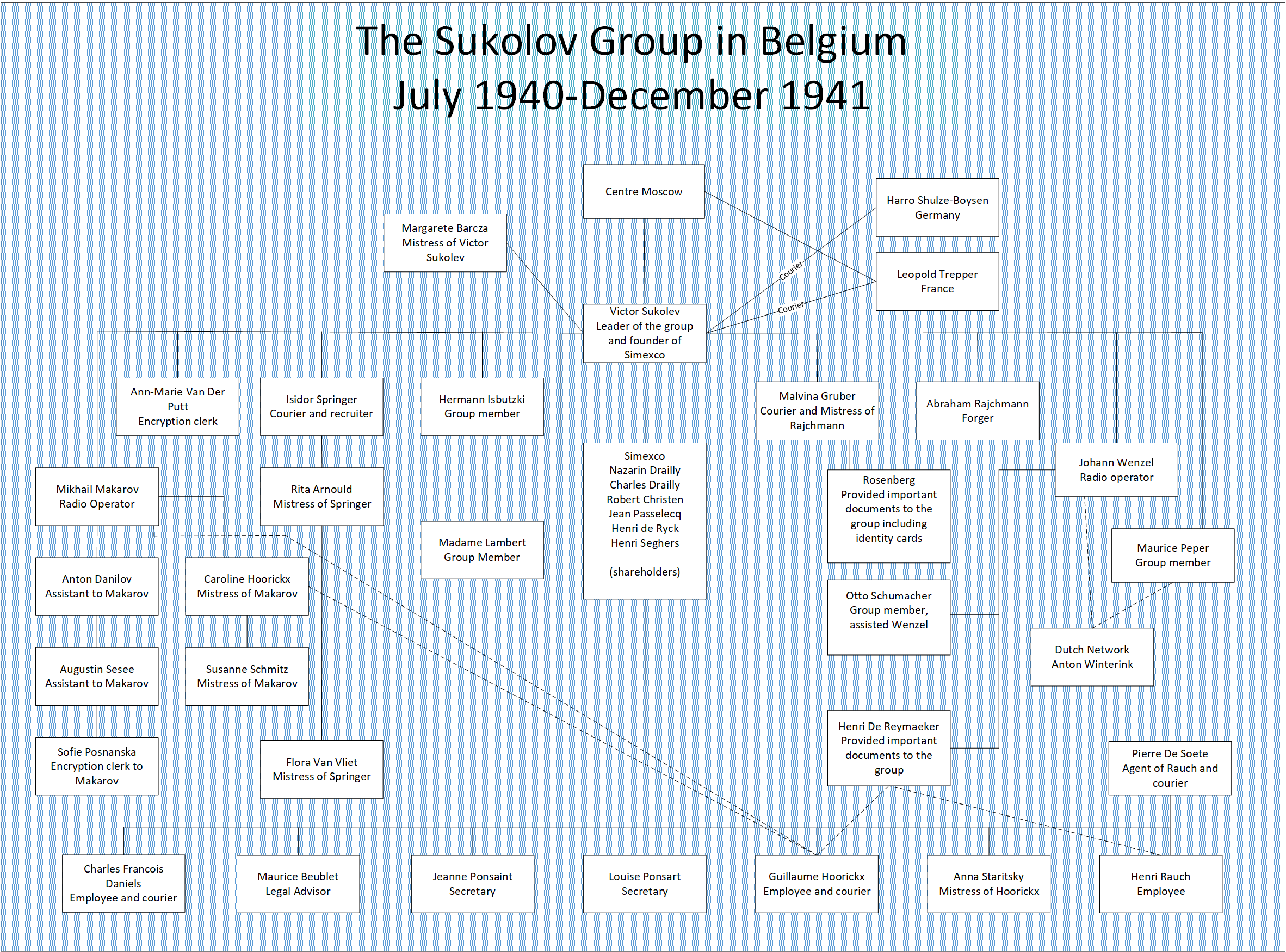
Gurevich group in Belgium between July 1940 to December 1941 in Belgium

Rajchmann was arrested by Abwehr officer, Harry Piepe, on the 2 September 1942. Rajchmann also decided to cooperate with the Abwehr resulting in his betrayal of his mistress, who was arrested in Paris on the 12 October 1942 at the Cafe de la Paix. Gruber immediately decided to cooperate with the Abwehr, in an attempt to avoid intensified interrogation, i.e. torture. Together with Rajchmann, she enthusiastically collaborated in betraying several agents in the network both in Brussels and later in Paris, that surprised German officials. She admitted the existence of a Soviet agent Anatoly Gurevich and his probable location, as well as exposing several members of the Trepper espionage network in France.

As a member of the Red Orchestra, it would have been expected that she and Rajchmann would have been executed. However, the fact that she survived was not due to their service to the Sonderkommando, but due to a Gestapo officer, Rudolf Radke, who became friendly with Gruber, saving Gruber from death on the pretext that the investigation was not completed.

After being released, Gruber was allowed to return to Brussels.

== Political attack ==
On 28 July 1944, two men entered Grubers garden at her villa in Avenue de Fléron and fired shots at her, hitting her in the chest three times and also hitting her daughter Alice in the thigh. Both survived. After being interrogated by Belgian and Dutch police and released in January 1945, she decided to move to Germany with her seven children.

== After World War II ==
After the war, Gruber was deported by Belgian authorities and she left to move to Czechoslovakia via Germany in October 1945. In August 1946, she was arrested in Germany. In August 1947 she was again in prison in Belgium, and in February 1949 Gruber was sentenced by court-martial in the province of Brabant, Belgium, to 10 years in prison for denunciation and fraud. The official publications of the sentence noted her being born in Jambokretz, Czechoslovakia, on 6 December 1906.

She was released in December 1951 and lived as a former Jewish concentration camp inmate and victim of Nazi rule in a Jewish retirement home in Munich. She then traveled on to her children in Israel and, according to a 1952 report, continued to work as a secret agent.
