= Heinz Pannwitz =

German war criminal and soldier

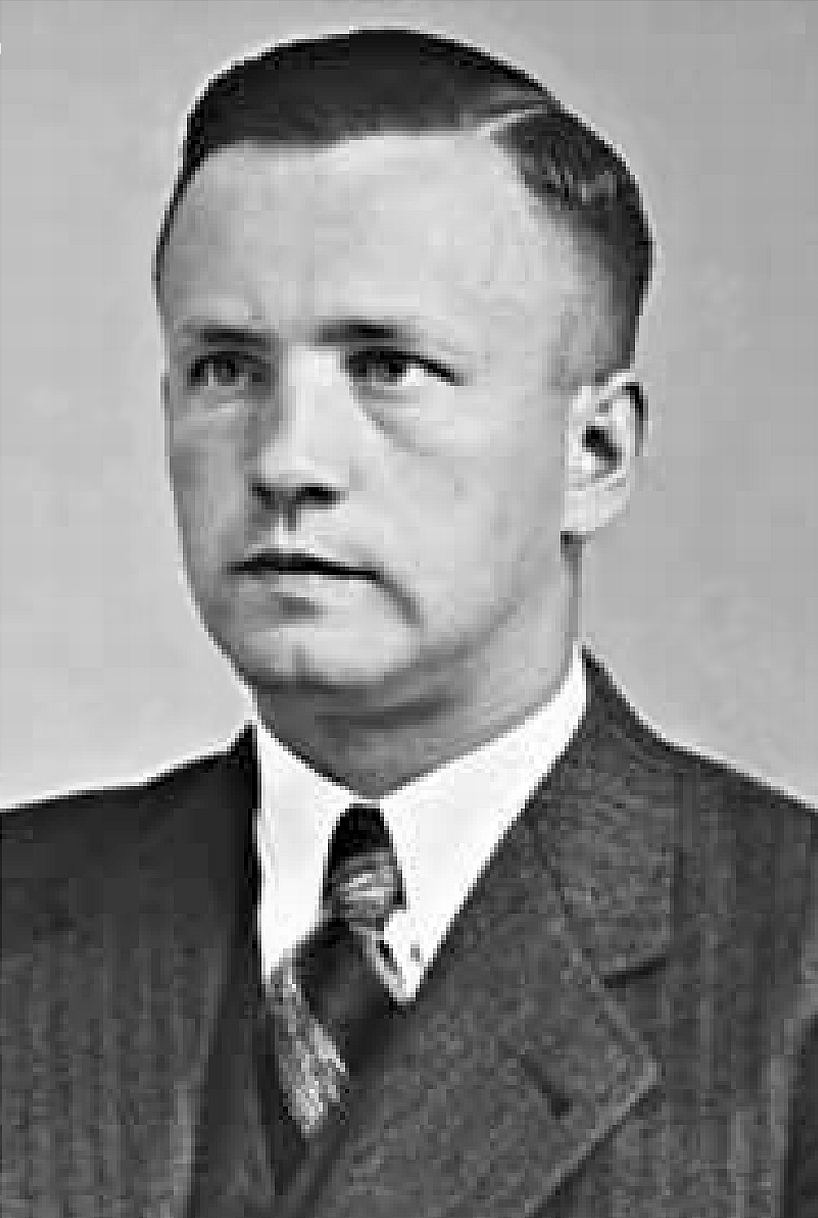
Heinz Pannwitz

Heinz Michael Pannwitz (née Heinz Paulsen; 28 July 1911, Berlin – 8 August 1975, Ludwigsburg) was a German war criminal, Nazi Gestapo officer and later Schutzstaffel (SS) officer. Pannwitz was most notable for directing the investigation into the assassination of Obergruppenführer Reinhard Heydrich on 27 May 1942 in Prague. In the last two years of the war, Pannwitz ran the Sonderkommando Rote Kapelle, a combined Abwehr and Gestapo counterintelligence operation against the Red Orchestra espionage network, in France and the Low Countries.

== Life ==
As a child, Pannwitz belonged to the Christliche Pfadfinderschaft Deutschlands scout association. As a youth Pannwitz was a member of the Evangelical Church in Germany but left due to divisions in the church over their stance towards Hitler and the Nazis. After completing his schooling, Pannwitz was employed as a fitter, but by 1931 was unemployed. Pannwitz then attended university to study theology and philosophy.

== Military career ==
In February 1932, Pannwitz joined the Hitler Youth. After the Nazi rise to power (Machtergreifung), Pannwitz joined the Sturmabteilung (SA) in August 1933, and transferred in 1939 to the Schutzstaffel (SS). In 1935, he did one year of military service in the Wehrmacht and was discharged as Lieutenant. On 1 May 1937, he joined the Nazi Party.

In 1936, Pannwitz applied to join the police service at the Berlin Police Headquarters and was hired. On 10 September 1938, he became a criminal police detective with the Berlin Criminal Investigation Department, where he headed the "aggravated burglary" department. In September 1938, in accordance with the Munich Agreement, Germany annexed the Sudetenland. In March 1939, after the full occupation of Czechoslovakia, Pannwitz was transferred in July 1939 to Prague to be a Gestapo officer, assigned to Amt IV, section 2a of the Reich Security Main Office. From 1940, he there led the Gestapo Unit II g, which was responsible for investigating assassinations, illegal possession of weapons and sabotage.

=== Heydrich assassination ===
Following the assassination attempt on the Deputy Reich Protector in Bohemia and Moravia, SS-Obergruppenführer Reinhard Heydrich on 27 May 1942 in Prague, Pannwitz was immediately assigned to lead the special commission investigating the Heydrich assassination. Pannwitz was the author of the official final report on the assassination. Pannwitz wrote the report in two parts. The first part contained the exact timeline of facts of the assassination and Gestapo operation, while the second part was critical of Heydrich's policies in Czechoslovakia, constructed as an examination of the assassins motives. When the report was submitted, it caused an immediate scandal amongst the Schutzstaffel who saw it as impinging the memory of the revered Nazi and he was ordered back to Berlin. Fearing for his life, he approached his old friends for help and the best they could do was draft him. In the autumn of 1942, Pannwitz was drafted by Abwehr office for the Wehrmacht, and was posted for several months as a Non-commissioned officer to a unit of the Brandenburgh Division run by the Abwehr that was located on Lake Ladoga on the Finnish-Russian border. Pannwitz remained with the unit for 4 months until the end of 1942. In September 1942, Pannwitz was promoted to Kriminalrat, equivalent to SS-Hauptsturmführer or SS-Sturmbannführer. In January 1943, he was recalled to Berlin to work for Heinrich Müller.

=== Red Orchestra ===
In the spring of 1943, Pannwitz was assigned to the Gestapo headquarters in Berlin, working there for several months with the aim of investigating the Red Orchestra.

From August 1943 until the spring of 1945, Pannwitz directed the Sonderkommando Rote Kapelle operations in Paris and France, as a successor to Karl Giering. The Sonderkommando was a counterintelligence unit established by Gestapo to investigate and arrest the People of the Red Orchestra. After the Gestapo had managed to detect and unmask Soviet Main Intelligence Directorate (GRU) agents in France, the Netherlands, and Belgium, the Sonderkommando successfully attempted to bring some of the GRU's agents under their control, in effect turning them. The Sonderkommando used the exposed radio transmitters for Funkspiel's, using a German radio team to control and send back disinformation to the Moscow information centre of the GRU and to obtain information about the Resistance in return. This procedure was coordinated with the head of the Gestapo in the Reich Security Main Office (RSHA), Heinrich Müller. One of the groups that Pannwitz was trying to destroy in Belgium was the Trepper Group. Pannwitz used various captured members of the Trepper Group for the funkspiels, such as Hermann Isbutzki.

== Capture ==
On 3 May 1945, Pannwitz was captured by French forces in a mountain hut near Bludenz, Vorarlberg, Austria, along with Anatoly Gurevich, who was a double agent and had been a member of the Trepper Group. Both were taken to Paris for interrogation, and both were eventually handed over to Soviet authorities. Pannwitz believed he would face charges for war crimes if he was surrendered to the U.S., so instead he opted to be sent to the Soviet Union.

In Moscow, they were immediately arrested and locked up in the Lubyanka. Pannwitz tried to justify his decisions to the Soviet interrogator Viktor Abakumov, who didn't believe that Pannwitz had been running Funkspiel for almost two and a half years. Pannwitz offered his counterintelligence services to the Soviets for some time but was eventually sentenced to 25 years in a Soviet Gulag for destroying the communist networks in Europe. Pannwitz was released early in 1954, and returned to West Germany from the Soviet Union in January 1956.

== CIA and Gehlen Organization ==
Pannwitz returned to Germany with Friedrich Panzinger, a former SS officer who was also a Soviet agent. Panzinger's purposes in Germany were to penetrate the Gehlen organisation through his old Gestapo contacts. Panzinger's actions drew suspicion on Pannwitz from the Federal Intelligence Service (Bundesnachrichtendienst; BND) who suspected Pannwitz was also a Soviet agent.

In August 1956, the BND organisation hired Pannwitz, perhaps to keep him away from the Central Intelligence Agency (CIA) or the Federal Office for the Protection of the Constitution (BfV). Although the BND was planning to interrogate Pannwitz, whom they considered a potentially important source, the BND failed to learn anything and, in turn, failed to send any reports to the CIA, as promised. Pannwitz through these proceedings seemed to be more concerned with money, insisting throughout his employment with the Gehlen Organization that his previous wartime Gestapo service as a Regierungsrat and his years in Soviet captivity should be recognised for pension purposes. By February 1958, Pannwitz had effectively achieved this.

In 1959, the BND finally handed Pannwitz over to the CIA. Again, he prioritised money and sought a long-term contract instead of monthly payments. He was not going to tell his story unless he was paid for it. By mid-1959, the CIA had completed debriefing and were satisfied that he was not a Soviet agent. The CIA noted that Pannwitz tried to portray the brutal and inhuman Gestapo in a favourable light.

Pannwitz, a vile torturer and murderer, lived until his death in 1975 with his wife in Ludwigsburg, where he worked as a sales representative.

== War crimes ==
Pannwitz would have faced charges of war crimes at the end of the war had he stayed in Germany. The evidence for this involves the killing of Suzanne Spaak and part of her family. Spaak was a member of the French Resistance, and later the Trepper Group, who was arrested on 9 November 1943 in Brussels. After being tortured in January 1944, Spaak was sentenced to death.

Pannwitz ordered her murder when the liberation of Paris was only a few days away in August 1944. She was shot by Pannwitz in her cell at Fresnes Prison. To hide his crimes he had the corpse buried in a cemetery at Cimetière parisien de Bagneux with the words A Belgian. At the same time, he sent a letter to Belgian Foreign Minister-in-exile, Paul-Henri Spaak, falsely assuring him that his sister-in-law, Suzanne, had been taken to Germany and was safe.

== Bibliography ==
- Pannwitz, Heinz (17 August 1959). "CARETINA: History of the Sonderkommando Rote Kappelle" (PDF). CIA. CIA Library. p. 73. Archived from the original (PDF) on 23 January 2017.
