= Rue des Saussaies =

Street in Paris, France

Coordinates: 48°52′16.5″N 2°19′3″E

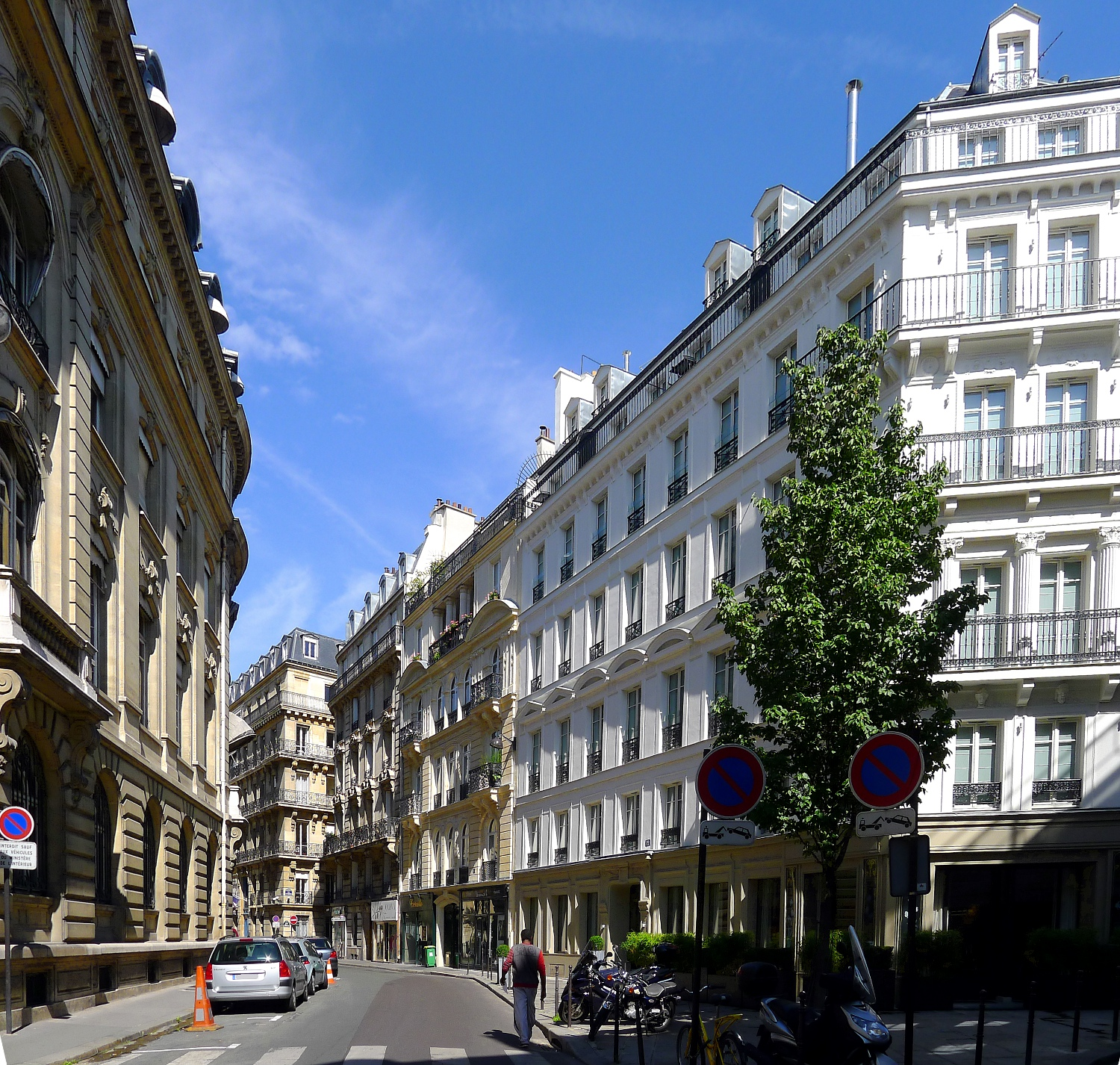
Rue des Saussaies

The Rue des Saussaies is a short (50 m long) street in the 8th arrondissement of Paris that adjoins the Ministry of the Interior. It begins at the Place Beauvau and finishes at the Place Saussaies. At number 10 lived the comte de Ségur, Napoleon I's master of ceremonies. At number 11 were the Gestapo headquarters for occupied Paris during World War II. After the war, number 11 housed the Ministry of the Interior, including the Sûreté nationale. At number 22, French composer Francis Poulenc was born, on 7 January 1899.
