= Karl Giering =

German Gestapo police officer (1900–1945)

Director of the Sonderkommando Rote Kapelle
- In office 1 November 1942 – 1 June 1943
- Appointed by: Heinrich Müller
- Succeeded by: Heinz Pannwitz

Personal details
- Born: 17 August 1900 Skwierzyna, Poland; German Empire
- Died: 9 November 1945 (aged 45) Berlin, Germany (assumed)

Military service
- Allegiance: German Empire; Nazi Germany
- Service: Berlin Police 1925–1933; Gestapo 1933–1945
- Rank: SS-Hauptsturmführer

Karl Giering (17 August 1900 – 9 November 1945 (Note: Many authors give the death year of Giering as the end of 1943 or 1944. Sigfried Grundmann cites a death certificate issued by the General Public Prosecutor of the GDR, which was sent to the General Public Prosecutor at the Berlin (West) Court of Appeal on 15 June 1966 with the date of death on 9 November 1945.)) was a German police officer. He was SS-Hauptsturmführer and Criminal Councillor in the Geheimes Staatspolizeiamt Berlin (Gestapo) and later Head of Department IV A 2 (Defence against Sabotage) in the Reichssicherheitshauptamt (RSHA). Giering is regarded as one of the most dangerous persecutors of the communist resistance against the Nazi regime. He commanded the Gestapo to smash the apparatus of the Betriebsberichterstattung (BB) of the Communist Party of Germany (KPD) and conducted investigations against the Soviet espionage network known as the Red Orchestra while part of the Sonderkommando Rote Kapelle.

== Life ==
Giering was born on 17 August 1900 in Skwierzyna. He was the son of a farmer, Reinhold Giering, who was also head of the local municipality. From 1907 to 1914, Giering undertook his early education at the primary school in Wiejce. Afterward, he was active in his father's official affairs and also worked on the farm. On 14 June 1918, he was drafted into the 50th Infantry Regiment in Rawicz. However, he did not take part in active service, as the war ended with the armistice. After his discharge from military service, he became a member of the Lüttwitz Freikorps on 25 March 1919. On 1 April 1920, he began service in the Reichswehr in the Reichswehr Ministry in Berlin. He left the Reichswehr on 5 November 1923 due to illness and then took up a job in plant security at the Osram company in Berlin. (Note: All information on his CV is the result of Karl Giering's personal details from a self-written CV, which is marked with the date stamp of 1 April 1940.) Between 1924 and 1925, he worked for the Viking League.

On 1 April 1925, Giering joined the preparatory service of the criminal investigation department in Berlin. After passing his probationary period, he was taken on as a civil servant. He then took up his service in the political police department I Ad II at the Berlin police headquarters where he remained until 1933. When the Nazis seized power in 1933, he was transferred to the Secret State Police, i.e. Gestapo. He then worked in Department II A 1 of the Communism Department, which was responsible for investigating members of communist resistance and espionage organisations. Giering lived in an apartment at Gervinusstrasse 12, close to the S-Bahn station in Charlottenburg, Berlin.

As a policeman, Giering preferred the use of psychological methods and a careful investigation.

== Early investigations ==
On 27 February 1933, the Reichstag was burnt down. The Nazi government interpreted this event as the beginning of a communist conspiracy against the regime. The Nazi regime regarded this event as the starting point of a political manoeuvre aimed at taking over the judicial apparatus and thus eliminating the political opposition. Further, this was intended to gain the support of the bourgeois-national conservative parties in the Reichstag to ensure the necessary majority to pass the Enabling Act of 24 March 1933, in order to then disempower the parliament.

A police search was made for the leading communist functionaries. However, the chairman of the Reichstag faction of the KPD, Ernst Torgler, thwarted the search, as he voluntarily surrendered to the authorities. This amazed the Gestapo. He wanted to protest against the false accusation of arson. In the trial that followed, Torgler was acquitted because he had collaborated with Nazi regime in prison.

Karl Giering was involved in these searches as the leader of the Investigative team B in Berlin. Following a denunciation, the chairman of the KPD, Ernst Thälmann, was arrested on 3 March 1933. On the following day, Giering searched the accommodation where Thälmann was hiding. Since Giering was able to show that investigations against the KPD had been very successful even before 1933, he was also assigned to the interrogation of Thälmann. Giering probably proceeded with great violence during the interrogation. To this day there is no proof that Giering was able to force a confession from Thälmann, that there had been a conspiracy against the Nazi regime. In this respect, the prosecution in the Reichstag fire trial, as with Ernst Torgler later, remained unsuccessful.

== Search for Herbert Wehner ==
Central Committee of the KPD member Georg Schumann, was arrested in June 1933. The name Wehner appeared in the Gestapo interrogation transcript on his case, along with his political function in the KPD. As a result of the interrogation, the Berlin Gestapo discovered that Herbert Wehner was responsible for the organisation of the last cadres of the KPD in Germany. Wehner had barely escaped arrest in Berlin on 3 March 1933, after trying to warn KPD members at the Wittenbergplatz, the location of the KPD headquarters.

From that point forward, Wehner was hunted by the Gestapo. To ensure he was not captured, he moved from place to place and made sure that no KPD members knew where he was staying. If he felt he was in danger, he would move to another location. Giering was the senior Gestapo officer who conducted the search for Wehner. To ensure he was successful, Giering employed Alfred Kattner a one-time confidant of Ernst Thälmann who had been arrested in March 1933, tortured and then persuaded to gather information for the Gestapo and then released with the task of infiltrating the KPD leadership as an informant. However, Kattner failed to locate Wehner's address. On the 5 February 1934, Giering had to state in his report:

"Despite an ongoing search, it was not possible to arrest W. He turns up wherever new instructions are issued in organisational matters, but he knows how to disguise himself so well that it is not possible for his closest colleagues to give any information about his actual whereabouts. While all other illegal party functionaries are provided with illegal offices and quarters by the quartermaster (called Iduna), Wehner procures these himself and thus completely encapsulates himself from his employees." (Note: Sassning gives Giering's first name as "Alfred", for reasons that are not clear)

== Destruction of the communist resistance ==
From 1933 onwards, Giering persecuted members of the Betriebsberichterstattung (BB Apparat), the industrial espionage organisation of the KPD. The investigations were also directed against the KPD's AM-Apparat. During his interrogations, Giering used all means of cunning, deception, enticement, blackmail and false promises. Giering wanted to obtain a confession from the arrested persons under all circumstances. Thus he did not shy away from the use of the most serious acts of violence, known as aggravated interrogation. (Note: Giering also interrogated the arrested Ernst Thälmann, who described him as a swine of the first order because of the methods Giering used. Thälmann described his torture as consisting of being beaten across his buttocks, with a whip made of hippopotamus hide.)

Giering tortured Walter Benzmann, a forger of passports for the KPD. On the 6 March 1936, Ewald Jahre, an employee of the BB Apparat, committed suicide after being interrogated by Giering. Werner Schneider, another KPD employee, was no longer able to bear Giering's abuse and hanged himself in his cell on 6 January 1937. Herbert Hopp, a KPD functionary, collapsed while being interrogated by Giering on 12 August 1935. Hopp managed to throw himself to death from an open window on the 4th floor of Gestapo headquarters.

However, Giering achieved numerous arrests with a skilful use of undercover agents, that were known in Germany as V-Mann, short for Vertrauens-mann. (German:V-Mann, plural V-Leute). They were arrested prisoners, whom he committed with this spying activity by promising severe punishment such as the death penalty, if they refused.

During the month of July 1937, Giering used seven informants, in this manner. Giering also did not shy away from acts of deception against the judiciary, if he wanted to ensure that his investigation was to be a success. In a letter dated 28 December 1937, he deceived the Reich Attorney at the People's Court, the Chief Public Prosecutor Wilhelm Huhnstock, when it came to the status about technical draughtsman Herbert Kleina, who had been sentenced to 15 years imprisonment for treason but had become an undercover agent for the Gestapo. (Note: As early as 1935, case law showed that the Gestapo should be deprived of judicial review by the courts. For example, in May 1935, the Prussian Higher Administrative Court designated the Gestapo as a special authority which was excluded from administrative judicial review. In a similar vein, the Hamburg Administrative Court ruled in October 1935 on the primacy of (Nazi) politics, over the jurisprudence of the judiciary.)

== Munich ==
In 1937, Giering attended a course at the Führerschule der Sicherheitspolizei in Berlin. In the following two years he fell ill and withdrew from active duty for many months. When the assassination attempt on Adolf Hitler was carried out in Munich in November 1939, Giering was involved in the investigation of the crime. This brought him the benevolent attention of Adolf Hitler, to whom he was personally introduced in this context towards the end of 1939. In 1940 he fell ill several times and visited a spa in April for one month, to recuperate.

== Moscow executions ==
After the invasion of Poland in September 1939, there were still reciprocal supplies of goods between the Soviet Union and the Nazi regime, with the Soviet Union supplying mainly oil and ores. In return, the Nazi regime supplied armaments. However, the Soviet side insisted on receiving deliveries of the latest developments, such as the Messerschmitt Bf 109 fighter plane. In return, the representatives of the RSHA demanded the extradition of German Communists living in Moscow. Representing Reinhard Heydrich, Giering negotiated the agreement in Moscow in February 1940. The opponent of this agreement was the responsible NKVD chairman Lavrentiy Beria. In the negotiations, Giering insisted on having a certain group of German communists extradited. But Beria demanded that they should remain in the Soviet Union. In April 1940 or one or two months later, eight RSHA members were able to shoot about 30 German communists south of Moscow. Except for one individual, they had all previously been in the service of the Soviet GRU.

== Red Orchestra ==
=== Brussels ===
On 26 June 1941 a radio transmission was intercepted, the first of many, by the Funkabwehr. In August 1941, the operation was given the name Rote Kapelle and the nature of the Soviet espionage network was first realised. By September 1941, over 250 messages had been intercepted, but it took several months for the Funkabwehr to reduce the suspected area of transmission to within the Belgium area. On 30 November 1941, close range direction-finding teams moved into Brussels and almost immediately found three transmitter signals. The Abwehr chose a location at 101 Rue des Atrébates, that provided the strongest signal and on 12 December 1941 the house was raided by the Abwehr. Inside the house were courier Rita Arnould, writing specialist and radio operator Anton Danilov as well as Soviet agent Sophia Poznańska. The radio transmitter was still warm. The women were trying to burn enciphered messages, which were recovered. Two photographs were also recovered. The Germans found a hidden room holding the material and equipment needed to produce forged documents, including blank passports and inks. While Arnould became an informer, Poznanska committed suicide in Saint-Gilles prison after being tortured. The next day radio operator Mikhail Makarov turned up at the house and was arrested. On 30 July 1942, the Funkabwehr identified a further house at 12 Rue de Namur, Brussels and Abwehr officer Harry Piepe arrested GRU radio operator, Johann Wenzel. Coded messages discovered in the house contained details of such startling content, the plans for Case Blue, that Abwehr officer Harry Piepe immediately drove to Berlin from Brussels to report to German High Command. His actions resulted in the formation of the Sonderkommando Rote Kapelle It was created by RSHA Amt (department) IV (Gestapo) section A2 (Sabotageabwehr), during September 1942, and was initially led by Friedrich Panzinger. It grew out of a 1942 agreement between the Funkabwehr, Abwehr and the Gestapo to identify members of the Red Orchestra resistance group.

In Berlin, the Gestapo was ordered to assist Harry Piepe and they selected Giering at the beginning of July 1942 to lead the investigation and the Sonderkommando Rote Kapelle. Giering's investigation linked the name Carlos Alamos with GRU officer Mikhail Makarov. On Giering's instructions, Makarov was taken to Berlin to undergo interrogation. Instead of being sent to Breendonk or a concentration camp, he was taken to Giering's home, where Giering hoped the homely environment would make him talk. However Makarov never exposed any details of the network and he was sent back to Saint-Gilles prison in Brussels.

Giering turned to Rita Arnould as the new lead in the investigation and she identified the Abwehr informer and Polish Jewish forger Abraham Rajchmann. It was Rajchmann who forged identity documents in the secret room of 101 Rue des Atrébates. Rajchmann in turn betrayed Soviet agent Konstantin Jeffremov who was arrested on 22 July 1942 in Brussels, while attempting to obtain forged identity documents for himself.

Jeffremov was to be tortured but agreed to cooperate and gave up several important members of the espionage network in Belgium and the Netherlands. Eventually Jeffremov began to work for the Sonderkommando. in a Funkspiel operation. Through Jeffremov, contact was made with Germaine Schneider, a courier who worked for the group between Brussels and Paris. However, Schneider contacted Leopold Trepper, the technical director of a Soviet Red Army Intelligence in western Europe. Trepper advised Schneider to sever all contact with Jeffremov and move to a hideout in Lyons. Giering instead focused on Germaine Schneider's husband Franz Schneider. In November 1942, Franz Schneider was interrogated by Giering but as he was not part of the network he was not arrested, and managed to inform Trepper that Jeffremov had been arrested.

Rajchmann was arrested by Piepe on 2 September 1942 when his usefulness as an informer to the Abwehr was at an end. Rajchmann also decided to cooperate with the Abwehr resulting in his betrayal of his mistress, the Comintern member Malvina Gruber, who was arrested on 12 October 1942. Gruber immediately decided to cooperate with the Abwehr, in an attempt to avoid intensified interrogation, i.e. torture. She admitted the existence of Soviet agent Anatoly Gurevich and his probable location, as well as exposing several members of the Trepper espionage network in France.

As part of the routine investigation, Harry Piepe discovered that the firm Simexco in Brussels was being used as a cover for Soviet espionage operations by the Trepper network. It was used as a means to generate monies that could be used in day-to-day operations by the espionage group unbeknownst to the employees of the company and at the same time provide travel documentation ( (Note: Known as the Ausweis, these were special versions of the Kennkarte, that enabled European wide travel.)) and facilities for European wide telephone communication between group members. Piepe was concerned about the large number of telegrams the company was sending to Berlin, Prague and Paris and decided to investigate it. Piepe visited the Chief Commissariat Officer for Brussels, who was responsible for the company. In the meeting Piepe showed the two photographs that had been discovered at the house at 101 Rue des Atrébates, to the commanding officer who immediately identified the aliases of Leopold Trepper and Anatoly Gurevich. As part of a combined operation with Giering in Paris, Piepe raided the offices of Simexco on the 19 November 1942. When the Gestapo entered the Simexco office they found only one person, a clerk, but managed to discover all the names and addresses of Simexco employees and shareholders from company records. Over the month of November, most of the people associated with the company were arrested and taken to Saint-Gilles Prison in Brussels or Fort Breendonk in Mechelen. The Nazi German tradition of Sippenhaft, meant that many family members of the accused were also arrested, interrogated and executed.

=== Paris ===
The Abwehr in Brussels and the Sonderkommando Rote Kapelle had full control of the Red Orchestra in Belgium and the Netherlands well before the end of 1942 and the Funkspiel was in operation. Funkspiel was the transmission of controlled information over a captured agent's radio so that the agent's parent service had no knowledge that the agent had turned, i.e. decided to work for the enemy. There is no clear indication as to when Giering, Piepe and the Sonderkommando moved to Paris, although various sources indicate it was October 1942. Perrault reports it was later summer rather than early autumn. When the unit moved, it relocated to 11 Rue des Saussaies. Before leaving, Piepe and Giering agreed that Rajchmann would be the best person to take to Paris and find Trepper. When they arrived in Paris, Giering sent Rajchmann out to visit all the dead letterboxes that he knew, while leaving a message to Trepper to contact him. However Trepper never showed up. Giering then tried to establish a meeting with a contact, using information from the correspondence between Simexco and an employee of the Paris office of the Belgian Chamber of Commerce. That ultimately proved unsuccessful, so Giering turned back to investigating Simexco. Giering visited the Seine District Commercial Court where he discovered that Léon Grossvogel was a shareholder of Simex. He had been informed by Jeffremov that Grossvogel was one of Trepper's assistants. Giering and Piepe decided to approach the offices of Organisation Todt to determine if they could provide a way to identify where Trepper was located. Giering obtained a signed certificate of cooperation from Otto von Stülpnagel, the military commander of occupied France and visited the Todt offices. Giering, together with the organisation commander, created a simple ruse to trap Trepper, acting as buyers of industrial diamonds. However, the ruse failed. Giering decided to start arresting employees of Simex. On 19 November 1942, Suzanne Cointe, a secretary at Simex, and Alfred Corbin the commercial director of the firm, were arrested. Corbin was interrogated but failed to disclose the location of Monsieur Gilbert, the alias that Trepper was using in his dealings with Simex, so Giering sent for a torture expert. However, Corbin's wife told the Abwehr that Corbin had given Trepper the name of a dentist. After being tortured, Corbin informed Giering of the address of Trepper's dentist. Trepper was subsequently arrested on 24 November by Piepe and Giering, while he was sitting in a dentist's chair. On the 24 November, Giering contacted Hitler to inform him of the capture of Trepper.

Both Trepper and Gurevich, who had been arrested on 9 November 1942, in Marseille and brought to Paris, were treated well by Giering. Trepper informed Giering that his family and relatives in the USSR would be killed if it became known to Soviet intelligence that he had been captured. Giering agreed that should Trepper collaborate, his arrest would remain a secret. Over the next few weeks, Trepper betrayed the names of agents to Giering including Léon Grossvogel, Hillel Katz and many other Soviet agents as well as members of the French Communist Party. According to Piepe, when Trepper talked, it was not out of fear of torture or defeat, but out of duty. While he gave up the names and addresses of most of the members of his own network, he was sacrificing his associates to protect the various members of the French Communist Party, whom he had an absolute belief in. Unlike Trepper, Gurevich refused to name any agents he had recruited.

Under instruction from Heinrich Himmler, Giering established a Funkspiel operation for Trepper and Gurevich in Paris which started in late December and continued until the end of the war.

Over the next eight months, Giering commanded the Sonderkommando Rote Kapelle in Paris, where the practical work of running the Funkspiel was managed by Gurevich. As the months past, Giering became ill with throat cancer and Giering's deputy, Gestapo officer Kriminalkommissar Heinrich Reiser, took over command of Sonderkommando in Paris but still under the control of Giering. Reiser formerly took over command of the unit in June 1943, when Giering's cancer reached an advanced stage. Reiser was an ineffective officer, in the process allowing the escape of Leopold Trepper on 13 September 1943. In August 1943, Heinz Pannwitz took over direction of the Sonderkommando Rote Kapelle operation in Paris and France.

== Death ==
He died in Halle on 9 November 1945 of cancer.
