= Alfred Corbin =

French resistance fighter (1916–1943)

Alfred Valentin Corbin (26 February 1916 at Clichy, France; 28 July 1943 in Plötzensee Prison, Berlin) was a French communist sympathiser, editor and reviewer, commercial director, and resistance fighter. Before the war, Corbin ran a poultry feed business with his brother. After serving in the French Foreign Legion in the lead up to the war, Corbin was recruited by Soviet intelligence to run a black market trading company. In 1941, Corbin worked as a director of the Paris-based, Simex black market trading company, that was in reality a cover for a Soviet espionage organisation, later known as the Red Orchestra ("Rote Kapelle").

== Life ==
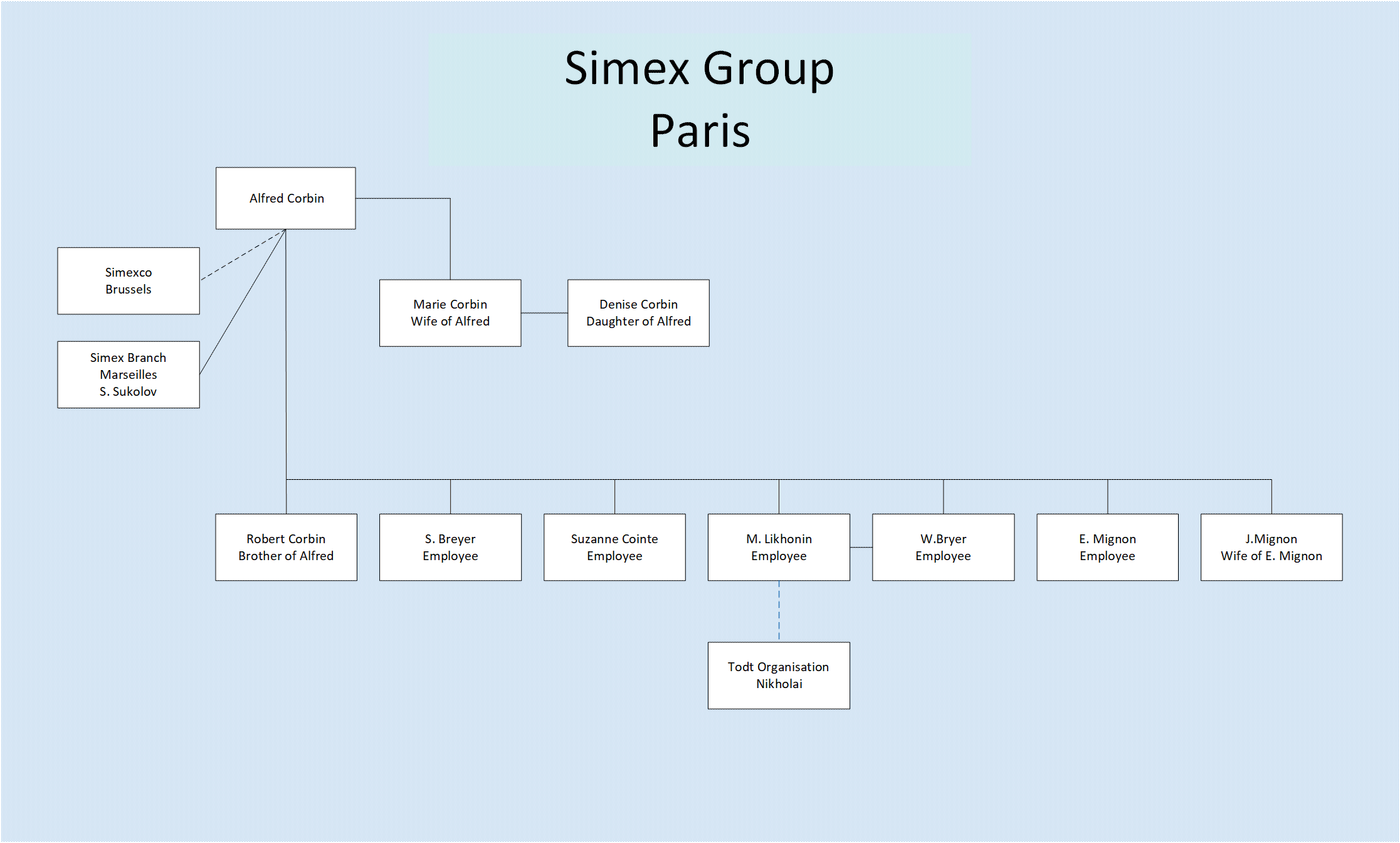
The Simex group was the 5th espionage group in Leopold Trepper organisation of seven groups.

Before the war, Corbin lived in an apartment on the 17th arrondissement of Paris along with his wife Marie Corbin and his 16-year-old daughter Denise. He and his brother Robert Corbin, ran their own business, making poultry feed and breeding chicken's in Giverny. At the same time as he ran the business, Corbin worked as a reviewer and editor, under the name A. Belleme, for the Brussels's based, Rustica publishing house. At the time, Rustica published farm animal care and feeding books.

== Career ==
Corbin was recruited to work in a covert trading firm that was in reality being run for the benefit of a Soviet espionage group, run by Leopold Trepper, a career Soviet agent of the Red Army Intelligence and the technical director of a Soviet Red Army Intelligence in western Europe. In 1940, Hillel Katz, who was the group's recruiter, approached Corbin personally to store a Wireless transmitter in Giverny, that was planned to be used to contact Soviet intelligence. Katz and Corbin had been in the same regiment in the French Foreign Legion, before the war. They had both escaped imprisonment by swimming the Somme after being captured in June 1940 during the German advance. Katz invited Corbin to come and run a new import and export business that his colleague was establishing. After 1940, the outlook for Corbin's poultry feed business was grim, due to the German advance. His brother Robert Corbin who lost his job at Creeds tailor's on the Rue Royale Paris, decided to join him, as the decision made good financial success.

=== Simex ===
In the autumn of 1940, Léon Grossvogel, a Polish-French Jewish businessman and a Comintern official used monies supplied by Jules Jaspar, a former Belgian consul to establish the Simex cover firm in Paris. Grossvogel became its managing director. Simex was a covert black market trading company. and was established in two rooms above the Le Lido next to 78 Champs-Élysées in Paris, Simex managed finances and gathered intelligence from German firms and the German military. Its main customer was Organisation Todt, the German military engineering organisation.

On 2 September 1941, Corbin became the commercial director of the firm when Grossvogel left to assist Trepper. Grossvogel felt his Jewishness would interfere with the contacts that the firm maintained and damage the business. Initially Corbin was not aware of the true nature of the Simexco company but as the months past, he began to suspect its real purpose. His brother Robert Corbin, became the main liaison between the business and Organisation Todt. In January 1942, Jules Jaspar left to establish a new branch of Simex in Marseille, along with the Soviet agent Anatoly Gurevich. Corbin maintained a good relationship with the Germans. In the context of travelling to Zone libre, Corbin worked as a courier between Paris, Marseille and Lyon.

In February 1942, the Simex company moved to 3rd floor offices at 89 Boulevard Haussmann in the 9th arrondissement of Paris, opposite the Saint Augustine church, at the insistence of Corbin, who believed their current location was rife with thieves.

== Arrest ==
On 19 November 1942, Corbin along with Suzanne Cointe, a secretary and Vladimir Keller, the Simex translator were arrested by Gestapo officer Karl Giering of the Sonderkommando Rote Kapelle. Corbin was put under enhanced interrogation by the Gestapo and subsequently informed them of the address of Trepper's dentist, that resulted in Trepper being arrested on 25 November 1942 by Giering.

== Court martial ==
On 8 March 1943, a Luftwaffe court martial was convened at the Roger & Gallet building, at 62-64 Rue du Faubourg Saint Honoré, Paris, that was presided over by General Judge of the Luftwaffe Manfred Roeder. The employees of Simex were tried at the court including Jaspar and his wife Claire Legrand. Corbin was sentenced to death by Roeder in a trial lasting mere minutes. Corbin along with many other prisoners were loaded onto closed train wagons and taken to Germany. Corbin was deported to The Lehrterstrasse prison in Moabit, Berlin. On 28 July 1943, he was executed by guillotine in Plötzensee Prison.
