= Leopold Trepper =

Polish Communist and career Soviet agent

Le Grand Chef Leopold Trepper
- Leopold Trepper in later life
- Born: 23 February 1904; Nowy Targ, Austria-Hungary
- Died: 19 January 1982 (aged 77); Jerusalem, Israel
- Occupation: Soviet intelligence officer
- Known for: Head of a Soviet Red Orchestra ("Rote Kapelle")
- Espionage activity
- Allegiance: Hashomer Hatzair (1924–1929); GRU
- Service years: 1923–1982
- Codename: Leopold Domb
- Codename: Jean Gilbert
- Codename: Adam Mikler

Leopold Zakharovich Trepper (23 February 1904 – 19 January 1982) was a Polish-Israeli Communist, career Soviet military intelligence officer of the Red Army Intelligence and resistance fighter. With the code name Otto, Trepper had worked with the Red Army since 1930.

Trepper and Richard Sorge, a Soviet military intelligence officer, were the two main Soviet agents in Europe and were employed as roving agents to set up espionage networks throughout Europe and in Japan. While Sorge was a penetration agent, Trepper ran a series of clandestine cells for organising agents in Europe. Trepper used the latest technology at the time—small wireless radios—to communicate with Soviet intelligence. Although the Funkabwehr's monitoring of the radios transmission eventually led to the destruction of Trepper's organisation, this sophisticated use of the technology enabled the espionage organisation to behave as a network with the ability to achieve tactical surprise and deliver high-quality intelligence, such as the warning of Operation Barbarossa. In 1936, Trepper became the technical director of a Soviet Red Army Intelligence unit in western Europe. He was responsible for recruiting agents and creating espionage networks.

Trepper was an experienced intelligence officer, and an extremely resourceful and capable man completely at home in the west. He was a man who could not be drawn in conversation, who lived a reclusive life, and had a talent of judging people that enabled him to easily penetrate significant groups. By the start of World War II, Trepper controlled a large espionage network in Belgium, that had links with Dutch, German and Swiss agents and operated seven separate espionage networks in France. By 1942, his operation had been discovered and he was arrested on 24 November 1942 by the Sonderkommando Rote Kapelle, who gave it the name Red Orchestra ("Rote Kapelle"). Trepper agreed to work with the Germans. He eventually betrayed many of his collaborators who went to their death, in an effort to shield the French Communist Party (PCF) from investigation. However, he eventually betrayed the vast majority of them as well. On 13 September 1943, he managed to escape. At the end of the war, he returned to the Soviet Union and was imprisoned for 10 years. When he was released, he returned to Poland. In 1974, he migrated to Israel with his wife and three sons.

== Life ==
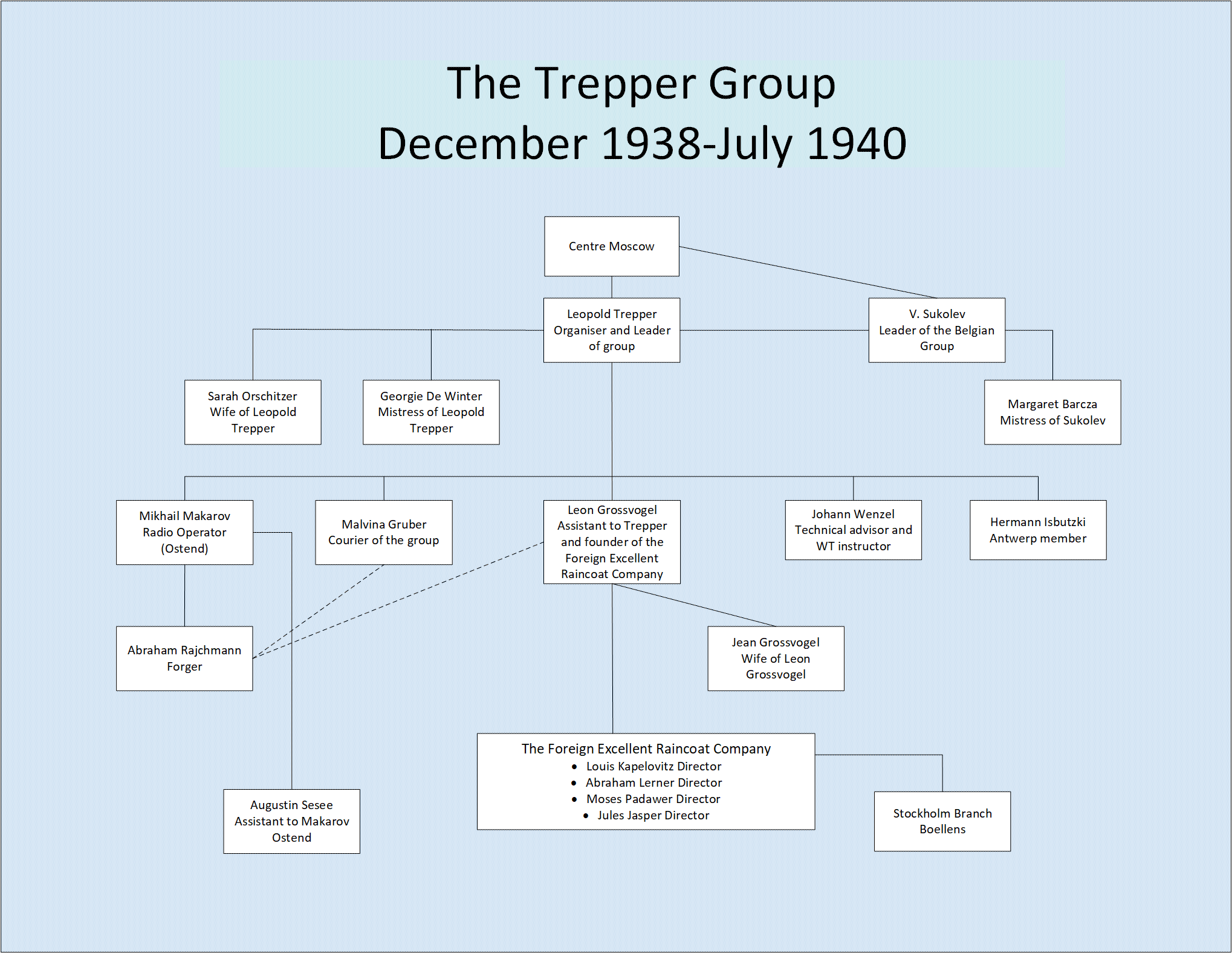
Diagram of the Trepper Group in Belgium

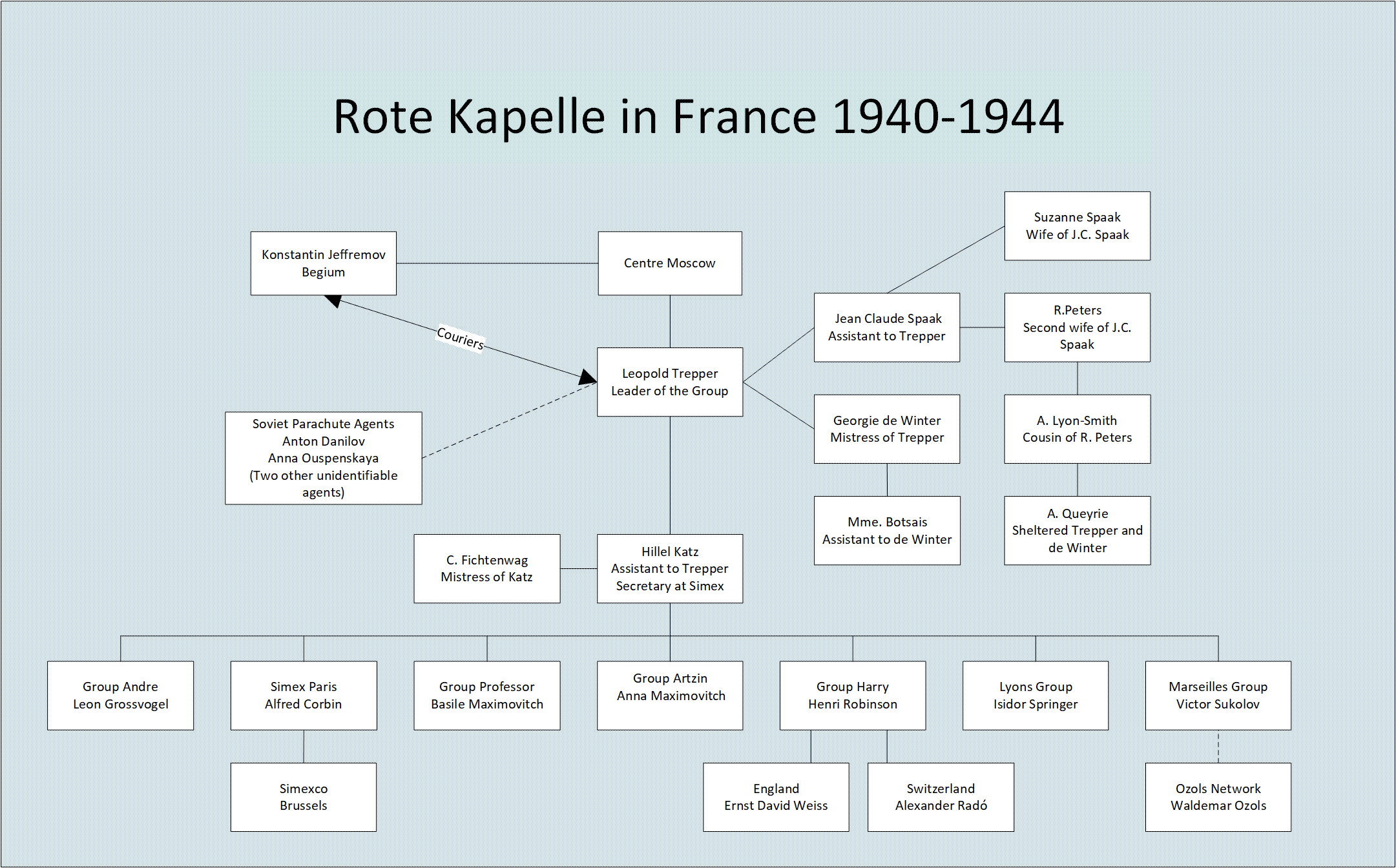
The Rote Kapelle in France between 1940 and 1944. This diagram details the seven networks run by Leopold Trepper

On 23 February 1904, Leopold Trepper was born to a large Jewish family of 10 children in Nowy Targ, Poland, which was part of Austria-Hungary at the time. Trepper's father was a travelling farm machinery and seed merchant who later died when Trepper was almost twelve, leaving the family in financial straits. His parents sent him to school in Lwów, to escape the strongly militant and anti-Semitic tradition in Poland. Trepper met his future wife, Luba, in Lwów. She worked in a chocolate factory and took evening classes to train as a teacher. She was also a Jewish communist who travelled under the aliases Sarah Orschitzer and Luba Brekson.

== Education ==
After school, Trepper moved to Kraków to study history and literature at the Jagiellonian University. His lack of money led him to left-wing student groups. After the October Revolution, he joined the Bolsheviks and became a communist.

After the Polish–Soviet War, Poland suffered an economic crisis and Trepper had to leave university due to a lack of funds.

== Politics ==
He found work first as a workshop locksmith, mason, and later worked in the mines in Katowice. After leaving the mines, he worked in Dąbrowa Górnicza where, due to extreme poverty and lack of food, he agitated the workers in Dombrova to strike. As one of the ringleaders, he was caught and imprisoned for eight months. His later pseudonym, Domb, came from Dombrowa, the German stylization of Dąbrowa Górnicza.

Trepper applied for a visa to France when he found it impossible to obtain work after the uprising, but was refused. Earlier, in 1916, Trepper had joined the Zionist, socialist movement Hashomer Hatzair. This membership was to help him in 1926 to emigrate to Haifa, Palestine, via Brindisi to work on the roads and later as an agricultural worker in a kibbutz. Orschitzer followed Trepper to Palestine. She was involved in an illegal communist demonstration, and was arrested and jailed; she would have been deported had she not married a Palestinian citizen.

After moving to Tel Aviv in 1929, Trepper became a member of the central committee of the Palestine Communist Party. Between 1928 and 1930, Trepper was the organiser of the Eḥud or Unity faction, a Jewish-Arab communist labour organisation within the Histadrut trade union body; most of its members came from the Kerem HaTeimanim area and worked against the British forces in Palestine. In 1929, he attended a meeting of the International Red Aid, where he was identified as an agitator and militant communist by the British, who subsequently arrested and interned him for 15 days at the citadel's prison in Acre, Israel. Trepper organised a hunger strike after learning that the communist prisoners were to be deported. He was released after news of the hunger strike reached London and the British newspapers. As they were too weak to walk due to lack of food, the hunger strikers were placed on stretchers outside the prison.

== Migration ==
In March 1930, after he was given the choice of leaving Palestine or being forcefully deported to Cyprus, Trepper travelled via Syria to Marseille, France, and worked as a dishwasher. He then travelled to Paris where he found work as a decorator living a poor existence. He came into contact with numerous left wing intellectuals and communist workers that eventually led him to become a member of the Rabkor, an illegal political organisation that was dominated by communists who sent both men and intelligence to Moscow. He continued to work for the organisation until French intelligence dismantled it in 1932. Trepper left Paris on a Polish passport and escaped to Berlin by train, where he contacted the Soviet embassy. After several days, he was ordered to report to Moscow in the spring of 1932.

Between 1932 and 1935, Trepper worked to become a GRU agent by learning his trade. After attending KUNMZ University, where he obtained a diploma, he studied history at the Institute of Red Professors and was awarded a degree, allowing him to work as a history teacher in Moscow. Trepper was in constant touch with the Russian intelligence instructors who taught him the practical skills of an espionage agent. At the same time, Orschitzer also attended KUNMZ University for a year.

In 1935, Trepper submitted a newspaper column covering art to the newspaper for Russian Jews called Truth. In the winter of the same year his training was completed.

== Espionage career ==
In 1935 or 1936, Trepper was given the post of technical director of Soviet intelligence in Western Europe. He returned to Paris on a passport under the name Sommer, and spent five months investigating the extensive network and accidentally exposed a double agent: a Dutch Jew who was the former head of the Soviet espionage network in the United States and was turned by the Federal Bureau of Investigation. He returned to the Soviet Union under the name Majeris to inform Soviet intelligence of his findings and went back to Paris five months later.

In 1936, Trepper visited Scandinavia for a short-term technical mission, before returning to Paris — which remained his base until the end of 1938 — in December. For most of 1937, he was concerned with extensive planning and re-organisation of Soviet intelligence operations in Western Europe; in that year he visited Switzerland, the British Isles, and Scandinavia.

=== Foreign Excellent Raincoat Company ===
In the autumn of 1938, Trepper made contact with Jewish businessman Léon Grossvogel, whom he knew in Palestine. Grossvogel ran a small business called "Le Roi du Caoutchouc" or "The Raincoat King" on behalf of its owners. Trepper used provided money to create the export division of The Raincoat King called the Foreign Excellent Raincoat Company, which dealt in raincoat exports and was considered by Trepper to be the ideal cover for the group's espionage network. As the business had to operate with the full knowledge of the state, shares had to be issued. Among the shareholders was former official of the Belgian Foreign Office, Jules Jaspar. Jaspar's brother, Henri Jaspar, was the former prime minister of Belgium, so Jaspar was seen as the ideal person to direct the company and provide it with a veneer of respectability. The company was created in December 1938.

On 6 March 1939, Trepper used the alias Adam Mikler and identified as a wealthy Canadian businessman, traveled from Quebec while being accompanied by wife, who traveled as Anna Mikler. They moved to Brussels from Paris, making it their new base and settled in their apartment located at 198 Avenue Richard Neybergh, Brussels. After the company was created, Trepper used the circulation of gossip and rumours by his group to spread the word that a wealthy Canadian had funded the business to establish his cover in the Belgian business community. On 25 March 1939, Trepper met the GRU intelligence agent Mikhail Makarov in a café. Makarov, a wireless telegraphy (WT) operator, forger, and expert on secret inks, had been sent from Moscow via Stockholm and Copenhagen to Paris whilst travelling on a Uruguayan passport, under the alias Carlos Alamo.

Makarov's original duty was to provide Trepper with forged documentation, but since Grossvogel had introduced Abraham Rajchmann, who became the group's forger, he became a WT operator for the group instead and was posted to Ostend to work at a branch of the Raincoat Company, which was sold to him to strengthen his cover. Makarov immediately started to train other operators in WT procedure. In July 1939 Anatoly Gurevich, posing as the wealthy Vincente Sierra, arrived in Brussels on a Uruguayan passport, and contacted Trepper in Ghent on 17 July. It was arranged that Trepper would teach the operation of the Raincoat Company to Gurevich, who would then move to Denmark to establish a new firm. To make contacts across different social strata, Gurevich familiarised himself with Belgian society and studied the country to learn about its economy. Gurevich took part in ballroom dancing and riding lessons, and as he travelled between luxury hotels, mail bearing the stamps of Uruguay awaited his arrival.

In the months leading up to the war, Trepper's plans changed, and Gurevich ended up working as an assistant to Trepper. Gurevich performed the normal bureaucratic operations in an espionage network including being a cipher clerk, deciphering instructions from Soviet intelligence, and preparing reports with information forwarded from a contact in the Soviet Trade Representation of Belgium. In 1939, Trepper met the American classical dancer, Georgie De Winter in Brussels. De Winter became Trepper's mistress and had a child, Patrick De Winter; historians are unsure if the child was Trepper's.

=== World War II ===
==== France ====
In July 1940, Trepper fled Belgium with Grossvogel and moved to Paris, where Grossvogel and Polish Jew Hillel Katz were Trepper's main assistants. Trepper changed his alias to Jean Gilbert and got in touch with General Ivan Susloparov, who was the Soviet military attaché in the Vichy government. On their first meeting, Trepper informed Susloparov of Adolf Hitler's plan to invade the Soviet Union, which the latter believed to be true. Trepper also arranged to have his wife and child returned to Moscow, and they left in August 1940. However, his main goal was to find and make use of a radio transmitter and a radio operator. Susloparov supplied the names of a couple who were Polish-Jewish militant communists — Hersch and Miriam Sokol — as possible radio operators—but both the Sokols had to be trained in radio procedures by Grossvogel. At the same time, Trepper recruited civil engineer and Russian aristocrat Basil Maximovitch.

==== Simexco and Simex ====
In March 1941, Simexco was established in Paris as a replacement cover company. The firm's profits were channelled to provide funding to the group, via its Department III. The firm made a considerable profit over the years that was used by both Trepper and Gurevich as a personal expense account. Additional funding came from Soviet intelligence, and was received in monthly sums of $8,000 to $10,000 through the Russian military attaché in Paris. When the war started, the funds were sent via Switzerland in dollar amounts that were agreed in advance with Soviet intelligence via radio and delivered to Trepper. The money was used to maintain the operations of the Trepper group and to cover the necessary expenses to carry out special assignments. Trepper spent lavishly on bribes, the upkeep of the Château de Billeron, sundries, and large daily expenses to maintain his cover as a successful businessman.

==== Robinson network ====
In September 1941, Trepper met with Comintern agent Henry Robinson, who was one of the most important sources of intelligence in Paris. He ran his own large espionage network, which had revealed to the Soviets that Hitler was inclined to call off Operation Sea Lion, the plan to invade the British Isles. The Comintern organisation had lost prestige with Stalin, who suspected it of deviating from Communist norms. Robinson was also suspected of being an agent of the Deuxième Bureau and was subsequently in ideological conflict with Soviet intelligence. It was unusual for two senior agents to meet, but an exception was made as it was felt by Soviet intelligence that Robinson's extensive contacts could help Trepper build his French network. Trepper learned of a radio transmitter that was being run by the French Communist Party in Paris from Robinson, and was ordered to take charge of Robinson's network.

Around that time, Trepper was introduced to Anna Maximovitch by her brother Basil Maximovitch. Both Anna and Basil became very important to Trepper. Basil had an affair with Margarete Hoffman-Scholz, secretary to Wehrmacht colonel Hans Kuprian, who was on a committee that processed prisoners from the Vichy government for slave labour, and a niece to General Carl-Heinrich von Stülpnagel, military commander of Paris. Anna was a psychiatric neurologist who opened a clinic in Choisy-le-Roi in the late 1940s. It was a moneyed area of Paris which enabled her to pick up gossip and recruit from her patients, some of whom were high ranking French nobility and administrative people including Rohan-Chabot's husband, Alain Louis Auguste Marie de Rohan-Chabot, who was a French officer and resistance fighter. One of those patients was Helene Claire Marie de Liencourt, Countess de Rohan-Chabot, who rented out the empty 18th-century Château Billeron located in Lugny-Champagne to Maximovitch as a meeting place for the group.

==== Rue des Atrébates ====
On 30 November 1941, the house at 101 Rue des Atrébates in Brussels, run by Rita Arnould and Zofia Poznańska and used to transmit intelligence, was discovered by the Funkabwehr. On 12 December 1941, the residence was raided by the Abwehr. By February 1942, Trepper re-established communication with Soviet intelligence and was able to give a full report on the situation. The Soviets instructed Trepper to contact Soviet Army Captain Konstantin Jeffremov, who had been living in Belgium. In May 1942, a meeting was arranged between the two men in Brussels, where Trepper instructed Jeffremov to take over Gurevich's Belgian and low-countries espionage network. He also instructed him to maintain radio silence for six months, and gave Jeffremov 100,000 Belgian francs for expenses. Radio communications for the espionage group in Brussels was to be operated by GRU agent Johann Wenzel. In January 1942, Trepper ordered Gurevich to travel to Marseille with Jules Jaspar and Alfred Corbin to establish a new branch office of Simex to enable the recruitment of a new espionage network.

In May 1942, Wenzel began transmitting important traffic to the Soviet Union. On 29–30 June 1942, the house that Wenzel was transmitting from, 12 Rue de Namur in Brussels, was raided by the local police under the command of Abwehr officer Harry Piepe. Wenzel was interrogated and tortured by the Gestapo for six to eight weeks and confessed to everything, including the cypher keys he used and his code name, which allowed the Funkabwehr to decipher a large amount of back traffic belonging to the group. After Wenzel's arrest, Jeffremov tried to hide, but was arrested on 22 July 1942 while trying to obtain false identity papers. One of the names that Wenzel surrendered was Rajchmann, who was placed under surveillance and arrested on 2 September 1942. Almost immediately, Rajchmann agreed to cooperate with the Abwehr. On 12 October 1942, Malvina Gruber, Rajchmann's mistress was arrested by the Abwehr in Brussels, and she immediately decided to cooperate with the Abwehr. She spoke of Gurevich and exposed the Trepper espionage network in France. Jeffremov (sources vary) also exposed the Simexco company name and the Trepper espionage network in France to the Abwehr.

==== Reorganisation ====
When the Sokols and Johann Wenzel were arrested, Trepper lost his radio link with Soviet intelligence. Trepper asked Robinson to arrange a radio link to Soviet intelligence, but the latter refused. Trepper turned to Gurevich in Marseille and visited him several times to establish contact with the Soviets, but Gurevich refused to use his transmitter and was effectively lost to the network. Trepper was forced to turn to Pierre and Suzanne Giraud, (Note: Suzanne Giraud was also known as Lucienne Giraud.) who were established to have a transmitter either at Saint-Leu-la-Forêt or Le Pecq (sources vary) by Grossvogel and ordered to master the equipment. Suzanne had originally worked as a cutout for Trepper, and the couple were unprepared for the work; they failed and were arrested by the Gestapo.

=== Arrest ===
On 19 November 1942, the premises of Simexco were searched by the Abwehr, and all known associates of the company were arrested. However, no espionage material was found and the interrogation of prisoners failed to determine the whereabouts of Monsieur Gilbert, the alias that Trepper was using in his dealings with the firm. After being tortured, the French commercial director of the firm, Alfred Corbin, informed the Gestapo of the address of Trepper's dentist, where Trepper was arrested on 25 November 1942 by Karl Giering. Trepper was imprisoned on a third floor room at 11 Rue des Saussaies in Paris. He offered to collaborate with the Abwehr, who subsequently treated Trepper leniently in the expectation that he would serve as a double agent in Paris. He was allowed to take daily walks and go into town to buy necessities, but always accompanied by two Sonderkommando guards. According to Piepe, when Trepper talked, it was not out of fear of torture or death, unlike Wenzel, but out of duty. While he gave up the names and addresses of most of the members of his own network, he sacrificed his associates to protect various members of the French Communist Party, in whom he had an absolute belief. The first people to be betrayed were his assistants Katz and Grossvogel. In 2002, author Patrick Marnham suggested Trepper not only exposed Soviet agent Henry Robinson, but may have been the source that betrayed French resistance leader Jean Moulin. When Gurevich was arrested on 9 November 1942 in Marseille, he was moved to Paris and kept in the next room to Trepper. There was a mutual animosity between the two men.

==== The Great Game ====
On 25 December 1942, Trepper was informed that he would be running a funkspiel that was known as "Eiffel". When Trepper wrote his memoir, "Le grand jeu" (The Great Game), he attached such great importance to the Funkspiel as a successful operation that he considered it his greatest victory. Trepper wrote that he succeeded in turning the worst of situations in his favour by convincing the Germans that only a meeting with a PCF contact could convince Soviet intelligence that he was free. He warned Soviet intelligence of the arrests in Paris and convinced them to seriously participate in the funkspiel, so as to both poison the funkspiel communications in a way that was beneficial to the Soviets and at the same time expose German plans. However, this was complete fabrication. Trepper claimed he managed to contact Soviet intelligence which was correct, but the claim that he received a response on the 23 February is false. (Note: This date is confirmed to be false in Firsov, Klehr, Haynes "Secret Cables of the Comintern 1933-1943".) The 23 February date which was both detailed by VE Tarrant in "The Red Orchestra" and Gilles Perraults "The Red Orchestra" was in fact the beginning of May, when Moussier is handed the message. This meant that Trepper had been imprisoned for more 4 months, while in contact with the PCF without them knowing he was captured, while it was being investigated and hunted by the Sonderkommando.

==== Funkspiel ====
On 25 December 1942, the first message sent by the funkspiel, was an request for Trepper to meet with a PCF contact. The meeting fell through resulting in Jacques Duclos receiving a message from the GRU on 18 February to arrange a new meeting with PCF contact "Michel". New dates were arranged for 7 or 14 March which was also missed due to Trepper changing the location. A new meeting was set for 18 or 25 April 1943, both Sundays but the treff was missed. The GRU didn't believe that Trepper messages were part of a deception plan and continued to arrange meeting dates, although the Comintern believed he was captured and tried to warn them. By 26 May, the PCF still believed the French network had not been compromised. The message exchange proves that Trepper passed his message to Moussier in June 1943. On 5 June, Duclos confirmed that Trepper was arrested. On 7 July 1943, the first part of Trepper's report was transmitted to Soviet intelligence by Jacques Duclos. The second part followed on 10 July. (Note: Trepper's report had been read by Duclos but it had taken some weeks to encipher the text due to its size. That was why it was transmitted in two parts.)

In June 1943, Soviet GRU officer Ivan Bolchakov conducted an analysis of the received messages from December 1942 and found that 23 out 63 were of sufficient quality and only 4 were considered valuable. It was indication of the low quality of the funkspiel operation, but it was still many weeks before the GRU realised it had been deceived.

The reasons for Trepper changing the dates in his memoir are not clear. Trepper named his associate "Michel" as Louis Grojnowski as the person he wished to meet. However, Grojnowski ran the trade union organisation Main-d'œuvre immigrée but was not directly associated with the PCF clandestine radio transmission organisation. Bourgeois identified "Michel" as Roland Madigou, an intermediary between Trepper and Fernand Pauriol, the main wireless telegraphy specialist for the PCF, indicating that Trepper's deception was designed to penetrate the PCF. Certainly the impact of the June transmission generated suspicions about Trepper's loyalty, due to the odd way the PCF had received the report in the first place, resulting in the GRU instructing Duclos to determine how they had received it. For between four and five months, the Sonderkammado were operating against the PCF with the help of Trepper, that resulted in many GRU and PCF resistance fighters being captured.

=== Escape ===
On 13 September 1943, Trepper escaped Gestapo custody while visiting a pharmacy, Pharmacie Baillie, near the railway station at St. Lazare. Although he was kept under guard, he managed to slip away and avoid recapture. He contacted De Winter, and they both agreed to hide out in Le Vésinet, where he wrote to Heinz Pannwitz to explain his disappearance was not an escape, but merely an attempt to ensure he stayed alive as a move that designed to provide the maximum advantage for Soviet intelligence. On 18 September 1943, the couple moved to a house in Suresnes that belonged to Mrs. Queyrie; De Winter worked as a courier to arrange the move. Trepper wrote to Pannwitz a second time, deploring the fact that in spite of his request, a search was being made for him, and that he was placed in a very uncomfortable position. At the time, Trepper was the subject of an Identification Order in France, German and Belgium as a "wanted dangerous spy".

Trepper contacted Suzanne Spaak and Jean Claude Spaak through De Winter, using the alias Jean Gilbert, in the hope that he could make contact with the French Communist Party who could send a message to the Soviet military attaché in London to warn them of the collapse of the network. Suzanne had a wide range of contacts and it was through her influence that Trepper hoped to contact Moscow. While they were waiting, De Winter organised another location where they could hide on Rue Du Chabanais, and they moved in on the 24 September.

Jean Claude had not heard from Trepper since 1942, when the Sokols had left a large sum of money, their identity, and ration cards with Spaak for safekeeping. Trepper asked Jean Claude to forward a message to one of his agents: "I will be at the church every Sunday morning between 10 and 11am. Signed Martik." Trepper hoped to make contact with an agent at a church in Auteuil. Trepper sent De Winter to the treff, on several Sundays in a row, but no contact was made. The couple then moved to a guest-house at Bourg-la-Reine. Trepper, who wanted to restart his clandestine activities, was wary of De Winter being identified by the Gestapo due to her constant visits to the Spaak household. He asked Jean Claude for the 100,000 francs, that had been deposited by the Sokols which he gave to De Winter for expenses and sent her to a hideout in a village near Chartres in the hope that she could be smuggled into the non-occupied zone. De Winter was provided with a letter of introduction by Antonia Lyon-Smith, a friend of the Spaaks, to a local doctor in Saint-Pierre-de-Chartreuse who was with the resistance. En route, De Winter was arrested on 17 October 1943 by Pannwitz. At the same time, Trepper went to the church in Auteuil and noticed a black Citroën car — the signature car of the Gestapo — and fled.

Trepper learned the Gestapo had visited all his previous addresses and were close to capturing him. He warned Jean Claude, who sent both his wife and children to Belgium, before travelling to Paris, where he hid out with friends until the end of the war. Trepper last saw Jean Claude before the liberation of 23 October 1943.

== Postwar period ==
In 1945, Trepper was related to the Soviet Union and was arrested upon arrival. From 1938, he had been under suspicion, as he was recruited by General Yan Karlovich Berzin, who had fallen out of favour and was dismissed in 1935.

Trepper was personally interrogated by SMERSH Chief Viktor Abakumov, and was interned in Lubyanka, Lefortovo, and Butyrka prison. He vigorously defended his position and managed to avoid execution, but remained in prison until 1955 for unknown reasons. After his release, he submitted a detailed plan to revive both Jewish cultural life and institutions in the Soviet Union, but the plan was rejected in 1956 after the 20th Congress of the Communist Party of the Soviet Union meeting. Afterward, he returned to Warsaw to his wife and three sons. Trepper was elected to run the Jewish cultural society Yidisher Kultur Farband and also ran its publishing house, Yiddish Bukh.

== Immigration to Israel ==
After the Six-Day War in June 1967, Władysław Gomułka of the Polish United Workers' Party gave an anti-Semitic diatribe, and when student unrest broke out in the spring of 1968, a state-organised antisemitic campaign began in Poland that led Trepper to begin the process of migrating to Israel.However, while the Polish communist government promoted and encouraged the emigration of thousands of Jews at that time, Trepper was continually refused a visa and placed under house arrest. Permission was refused until international pressure from worldwide publicity campaign that included his sons' protests and hunger strikes, forced the authorities to allow him and a few Jewish people who were in a similar situation to leave. He settled in Jerusalem in 1974.

== Death ==
Trepper died in Jerusalem in 1982 and was buried there. According to a contemporary report from the news agency, Jewish Telegraphic Agency, "no government representatives or officials attended his funeral", though the Israeli Defence Minister Ariel Sharon, later the 11th Prime Minister of Israel, subsequently awarded Trepper the Emblem of Israel in a ceremony "attended by dozens of former members of anti-Nazi partisans and fighting groups".

== Bibliography ==
- Bar-Joseph, Uri; McDermott, Rose (2017). Intelligence Success and Failure: The Human Factor. Oxford University Press. ISBN 978-0-19-934174-0.
- Berger-Barzilai, Joseph (2007). Encyclopaedia Judaica (in Portuguese). Vol. 20 (2nd ed.). Detroit: Macmillan Reference USA in association with the Keter Pub. House. pp. 133–134. ISBN 978-0-02-865948-0.
- Bennett, Richard (24 April 2012). Espionage: Spies and Secrets. Ebury Publishing. ISBN 978-1-4481-3214-0.
- Bourgeois, Guillaume (24 September 2015). La véritable histoire de l'orchestre rouge [The True Story of the Red Orchestra] (in French). Paris: Nouveau Monde Editions. ISBN 978-2-36942-069-9.
- Coppi, Hans Jr. (July 1996). Dietrich Bracher, Karl; Schwarz, Hans-Peter; Möller, Horst (eds.). "Die Rote Kapelle" [The Red Orchestra in the field of conflict and intelligence activity, The Trepper Report June 1943] (PDF). Quarterly Books for Contemporary History (in German). 44 (3). Munich: Institute of Contemporary History: 431–548. ISSN 0042-5702. Archived from the original (PDF) on 2015-05-18.
- Dallin, David J. (1964). Soviet Espionage. New Haven: Yale University Press.
- Erofeev, Yuri Nikolaevich (24 November 2006). "The general who went down in history" (in Russian). Moscow. Nezavisimaya Gazeta.
- Firsov, Fridrikh Igorevich; Klehr, Harvey; Haynes, John Earl (27 May 2014). Secret Cables of the Comintern, 1933-1943. Yale University Press. ISBN 978-0-300-19822-5.
- Green, David B. (22 February 2014). "This Day in Jewish History / Soviet Spy Leopold Trepper Is Born" (Audio). Haaretz Daily Newspaper Ltd. Haaretz. Jewish World.
- Kesaris, Paul. L, ed. (1979). The Rote Kapelle: the CIA's history of Soviet intelligence and espionage networks in Western Europe, 1936-1945 (pdf). Washington DC: University Publications of America. ISBN 978-0-89093-203-2.
- Marnham, Patrick (2002). Resistance and betrayal: the death and life of the greatest hero of the French Resistance (1st U.S. ed.). New York: Random House. ISBN 978-0375506086. OCLC 224063740.
- Perrault, Gilles (1969). The Red Orchestra. New York: Schocken Books. ISBN 0805209522.
- Richelson, Jeffrey T. (17 July 1997). A Century of Spies: Intelligence in the Twentieth Century. Oxford University Press, USA. ISBN 978-0-19-511390-7.
- Sims, Jennifer (2005). "Transforming U.S. Espionage: A Contrarian's Approach". Georgetown Journal of International Affairs. 6 (1). Georgetown University Press: 53–59.
- "Leopold Trepper". The National Archives, Kew. 12 December 1944.
- Tyas, Stephen (25 June 2017). SS-Major Horst Kopkow: From the Gestapo to British Intelligence. Fonthill Media. pp. 91–92. GGKEY:JT39J4WQW30.
- Tucker, Robert C. (March 1978). "Stalinism: Essays in Historical Interpretation". Slavic Review. 37 (1). Cambridge University Press: 128–130.
- Verkaik, Robert (2025). The Traitor of Arnhem The Untold Story of WWII's Greatest Betrayal and the Moment That Changed History Forever. New York: Pegasus Books. p. 93. ISBN 9781639368280. OCLC 1490381881.
- West, Nigel (12 November 2007). Historical Dictionary of World War II Intelligence. Scarecrow Press. ISBN 978-0-8108-6421-4.
