= Simexco and Simex =

Simexco and Simex were the names of two black market trading companies that were created in 1940 and 1941, respectively in Brussels and Paris on the orders of Red Army Intelligence officer Leopold Trepper, for the express purpose of acting as cover for a Soviet espionage group that operated in Europe, and was later called the Red Orchestra ("Rote Kapelle") by the Abwehr.

== Simexco ==
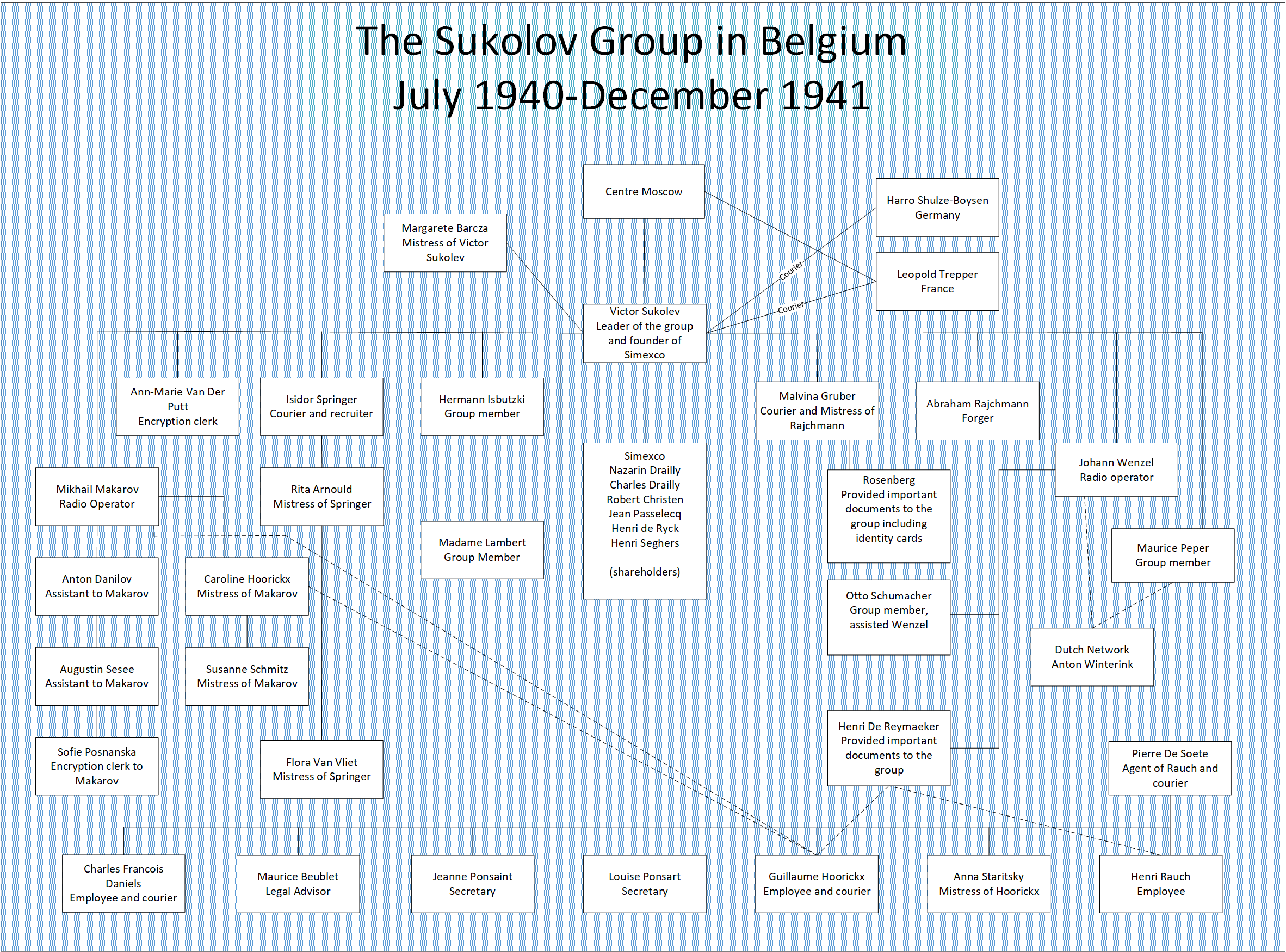
The espionage group run by Anatoly Gurevich was responsible for creating Simexco after the Foreign Excellent Raincoat Company was seized during the occupation of Belgium

In the autumn of 1940, the Simexco firm was established by GRU officer Anatoly Gurevich and Belgian businessman Nazarin Drailly, who was the firm's main shareholder. The firm was officially registered by March 1941, when it opened in two offices at 192 Rue Royale in Brussels. Simexco was established as a replacement cover organisation when the Brussels rain-ware export company known as the Foreign Excellent Raincoat Company was sequestered on 17 May 1940 after the occupation of Brussels, as its owner Léon Grossvogel was Jewish.

Simexco located at 192 rue Royale in Brussels was established as a genuine business with an absolutely firm legal status that was recognised as conservative in its approach by German service departments. On the recommendation of the administrative staff at the Abwehr IIIF. Ast. military command, it was granted long distance, telegram communication, telephone and fax facilities by the German authorities that provided a regular and privileged way for Trepper and Gurevich to communicate.

Gurevich became a director of the business. According to the article of incorporation, the main investor was Nazarine Drailly, a Belgian communist and informer, who invested 218,500 Belgian Francs in the firm. Drailly was fully aware of the companies true purpose and actively took part in operations. Drailly's brother, Charles Drailly, a banker, became a commercial director of the firm in March 1941. He was almost certainly aware of the nature of the firm, but maintained his distance in his role as a director, never taking part in espionage operations.

Margarete (or Marguerite) Barcza, the daughter of a Czech millionaire, who lived with Gurevich, helped to find additional shareholders among her bridge club. These shareholders were Florida nightclub owner, Robert Christen, travelling salesman Jean Passelecq, the publisher Henri de Ryck, who was a friend of Gurevich and Henri Seghers, the owner of a cigarette factory.

== Simex ==
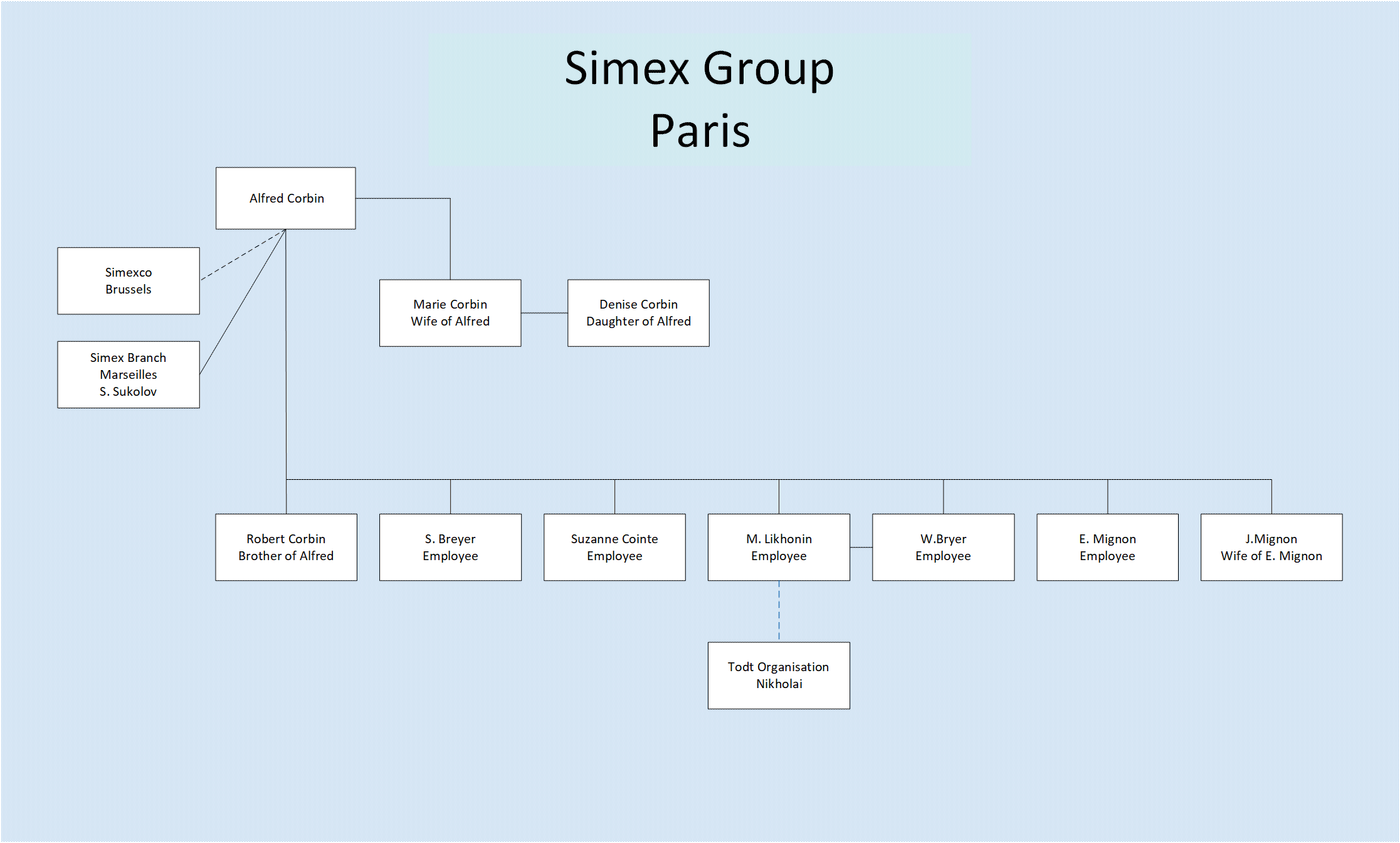
The Simex group was the fifth espionage group in Leopold Trepper organisation of seven groups. It managed finances and gathered intelligence from German firms and the German military

In autumn 1940, Simex opened its office, in two rooms above the Le Lido next to 78 Champs-Élysées in Paris, and opposite the offices of Organisation Todt, the German military engineering organisation, who would become its best customer. It took almost a year of work, starting in the autumn of 1940 for Léon Grossvogel and Hillel Katz to register the business with the Paris Commercial Court on 26 September 1940. Its name was a metonym for S for Societe, IM for Import, EX for Export. It was established to be a large company offering civil and military engineering contract services, general dealership and materials for Nazi German contracts resulting from the occupation. Trepper who used the alias Monsieur Gilbert in his dealings with the firm and several members of staff used the company to obtain special permits that allowed them to cross demarcation lines to observe the progress of construction.

The funding used to create the company was monies salvaged by Jules Jaspar from the rain-ware company in Belgium, along with additional funds that were provided by Soviet intelligence. This resulted in a financial capitalisation for Simex to the tune 300,000 French francs. Although Trepper became one of the main directors and general manager of the firm, using the alias Monsieur Jean Gilbert when dealing with any of the employees, he was not a shareholder. The businessman, Léon Grossvogel was the main shareholder and Robert Breyer, a friend of Grossvogel who was the other shareholder. The office personnel of Simex consisted of seven people, of which only three were aware of the real nature of the business. These were Trepper as Gilbert, Polish communist Hillel Katz, Gilbert's main assistant and French communist Suzanne Cointe, Gilbert's private secretary. Katz was Trepper's assistant and had known his since they were both in Palestine. In the day-to-day operations of the business, both Trepper in the role of Monsieur Gilbert and Grossvogel, an industrialist who does business always on the go, are ignored by office staff. The most important of the permanent staff was Suzanne Cointe, who was considered by Trepper to be our man at Simex. However, Trepper, who spent lavishly to establish a front that also included bribery of German officers. Trepper kept accurate note of spending, that had to be accounted for by Soviet intelligence.

In December 1941, Jaspar left to run the Simex branch on the Rue Dragon in Marseille, French commercial director Alfred Corbin took over. Corbin, an experienced businessman, had been recruited by Katz. Both Corbin and Jaspar were unaware of the espionage nature of Simex. On 20 November 1941, when Jaspar was arrested, he stated he thought he was working for British intelligence.

In February 1942, the company moved to 3rd floor offices at 89 Boulevard Haussmann at the insistence of Alfred Corbin, who believed their current location was rife with thieves.

== Expenses ==
Both the Simex and Simexco companies flourished and made substantial profits in return. In 1941, the net profits of both Simex and Simexco reached 1,616,000 Francs and in 1942, 1,614,000, after the costs of running the network were deducted. Trepper kept strict accounts as he had to submit them to Moscow for audit. His group were paid in dollars, the traditional currency used by Moscow for their agents. In 1939, Trepper received 350 dollars a month, but this was cut to 275 dollars a month, when his wife and children were in Russia. His agents, Makarov, Gurevich and Grossvogel each initially received 175 dollars a month, before it also upped to 275 dollars. Trepper also had to account for monies spent in each location where a group operated. From 1 June to 31 December, Trepper spent 5650 dollars in Brussels and 9421 dollars in Paris. These were only for daily expenses. Trepper used the money earned from Simex and Simexco to spend lavishly. This spend included bribes and money for the upkeep of the Château de Billeron (Note: The small Château de Billeron, in the Lugny-Champagne commune was the location of a health clinic, run by neuropsychiatrist and Soviet agent "nerve doctor" Anna Maximovitch. Maximovitch had rented the property from the French officer and resistance fighter Alain Louis Auguste Marie de Rohan-Chabot and his wife Helene Claire Marie de Liencourt, Countess de Rohan-Chabot to run her clinic, both friends and clients of Maximovitch. Due to its remote location it was implicitly used as a safehouse for the espionage group.) and large daily expenses to maintain the veneer of a successful businessman. Trepper kept the accounts locked in a large clock in house at Verviers. To insure against financial ruin, he kept a special reserve of monies in the form of 1000 gold dollars in jars at a house of a trusted agent.

== Discovery and arrest ==
On 13 December 1941, the German radio counterintelligence organisation, Funkabwehr, discovered the safehouse apartment at 101 Rue des Atrébates in Brussels, that led to the arrest and among others of Gurevich's radio operator, Red Army Lieutenant Anton Danilov. Gurevich himself hid in the house of Nazarin Drailly to evade the Gestapo, while he made arrangements to transfer ownership of the organisation to Drailly, before leaving for Paris in the same month. When he left, Drailly took over management of the firm. On the 19 November 1942, the offices of Simexco was raided by the Gestapo after several months of surveillance. The Simex office in Paris was raided in the same day. When the Gestapo entered the Simexco office they found only one person, a clerk, but managed to discover all the names and addresses of Simexco employees and shareholders from company records.

Over the month of November, most of the people associated with company were arrested and taken to Saint-Gilles Prison in Brussels or Fort Breendonk in Mechelen. Some people managed to avoid early capture, like Nazarin Drailly, but he was eventually captured on 6 January 1943. His daughter, Solange Eva Drailly (born 1 February 1926), was also arrested, but released due to lack of evidence. Drailly was tortured with dogs that ripped his legs to shreds and they had to be amputated. The prisoners in St. Gilles were sent to Berlin by train, and taken to Gestapo HQ at Mauthausen concentration camp for further interrogation, before execution in Plötzensee Prison. The Nazi German tradition of Sippenhaft, meant than many family members of the accused were executed.
