= Giering =

Giering is a surname. Notable people with the surname include:

- Frank Giering (1971–2010), German actor
- Karl Giering (1900–1945), German Gestapo officer
- Konrad Giering (born 1987), South African figure skater
