= Jules Jaspar =

Belgian diplomat and businessman

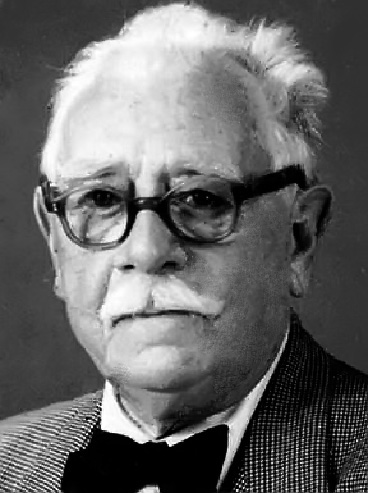
- Jules Jaspar
- Born: 1 March 1878; Schaerbeek, Belgium
- Died: 15 October 1963 (aged 85); Soudorgues, France
- Occupations: Consul; Businessman
- Years active: 1939–1942
- Organization: Red Orchestra
- Known for: Director of the Foreign Excellent Raincoat Company
- Spouse: Claire Legrand (19??–1944; her death)

Jules Jaspar (1 March 1878 – 15 October 1963) was a diplomat of the Belgian Foreign Office and businessman. He belonged to an eminent family in Belgium and was famous in the Belgian political world. His brother, Henri Jaspar, was Prime Minister of Belgium from 1926 to 1931 and his nephew was the Belgian diplomat Marcel-Henri Jaspar. Another brother was the eminent architect Ernest Jaspar. In 1939, he established the Brussels based Foreign Excellent Raincoat Company that was being used as cover for Soviet espionage operations. Following the German invasion of Belgium, Jaspar fled to Paris where he helped establish the black market trading firm of Simex. In December 1941 he moved to Marseille to open a branch of Simex. On 12 November 1942, he was arrested and sent to Auschwitz concentration camp and survived the war.

== Life ==
Jules Jasper was born in 1 March 1878 in Schaerbeek, Belgium to businessman Pierre Jaspar and Elisabeth Jaspar née Haeseleer. In the second half of the 19th century, his father worked for Leopold II of Belgium. His brother, Henri Jaspar was Prime Minister of Belgium and his other brother, Ernest Jaspar was the appointed architect of Baron Édouard Empain.

== Career ==
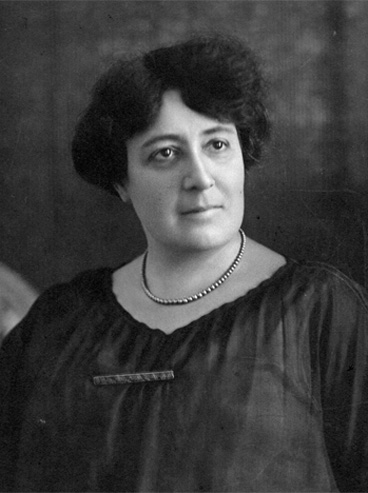
Claire Jaspar-Legrand, spouse of Jules Jaspar. She was executed in Auschwitz.

Jaspar worked for the Belgian Foreign Ministry for a long time and represented his country as consul in Indochina and later in Scandinavia.

Through his family's holdings in import and export companies and his commercial activities, he became acquainted and later friendly with the businessman and Comintern official Léon Grossvogel who was the commercial director of the company Le Roi du Caoutchouc or The Raincoat King. Grossvogel had starting working with Red Army Intelligence agent, Leopold Trepper in the autumn of 1938.

Trepper had a plan to create a business that would be the export division of The Raincoat King and agreed with Grossvogel the plan to create a new business that would be the ideal cover for espionage network. The new business that was created in Brussels in December 1938 and was known as Foreign Excellent Raincoat Company. Jaspar became a director of the company.

In May 1940, Jaspar fled Belgium and moved to Paris, along with his wife, Claire Legrand, as well as Jeanne Fernande Grossvogel, and Nazarin Drailly with his family. Jaspar managed to salvage 200,000 Belgian francs from the Foreign Excellent Raincoat Company. In the autumn of 1940, the funds along with a subsidy provided by Soviet intelligence was used to establish the new cover firm of Simex in Paris.

In December 1941, Jaspar moved to Marseille and in January 1942, he assisted Soviet agent Anatoly Gurevich in the establishment of a new branch office of Simex that was run by French commercial director, Alfred Corbin, who had managed Simex in Paris. Under cover of the new branch, Gurevich established a new network of Czech agents, across Southern France.

== Arrest and trial ==
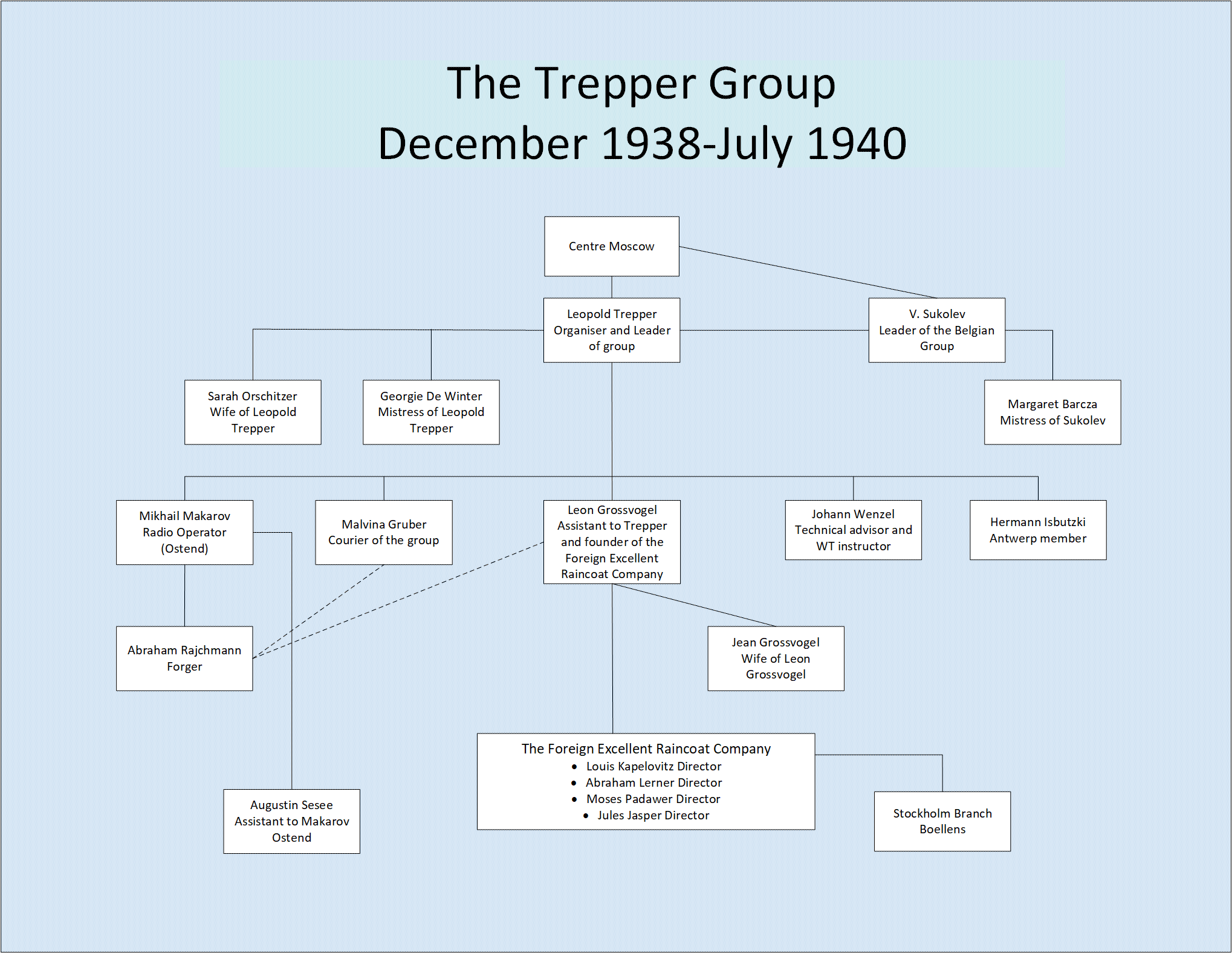
Diagram of the Trepper Group in Belgium

On 12 November 1942 Jaspar was arrested, along with his wife and secretary, by French police at the Simex branch office, on Rue du Dragon in Marseille.

On 8 March 1943 a Luftwaffe court martial was convened at the Roger & Gallet building, at 62-64 Rue du Faubourg Saint Honoré, Paris, that was presided over by General Judge of the Luftwaffe and Nazi apologist Manfred Roeder. The employees of Simex were tried at the court including Jaspar and Legrand.

On 15 April 1943 Jaspar and Legrand, along with many others from Fresnes Prison, were loaded onto closed train wagons and taken to Germany. Jaspar was deported to Mauthausen concentration camp. Claire Legrand was deported to Ravensbrück concentration camp and then to Auschwitz concentration camp in January 1944, where she was murdered in the gas chamber in November 1944.

== Later life ==
Jaspar was liberated on 5 May 1945. On 2 April 1948 he was recognized as a political prisoner and later, on 5 March 1957, as a civilian resistance fighter.

== See also ==
- Red Orchestra ("Rote Kapelle")
- People of the Red Orchestra
