= Hillel Katz =

Soviet GRU officer, who was part of the Rote Kapelle

- Hillel Katz
- Born: 24 September 1905; Cieszyn, Austro-Hungarian Empire
- Occupation: Active Resistance member
- Years active: 1933 to 1943
- Organization: Red Orchestra ("Rote Kapelle")
- Known for: Secretary to Leopold Trepper

Hillel Katz (born 24 September 1905 in Cieszyn, Austro-Hungarian Empire) was a Jewish Communist, who was an important member of a Soviet espionage network in occupied France, that the German Abwehr intelligence service later called the "Red Orchestra" ("Rote Kapelle"). In the role of an underground executive and recruiter, he acted as both secretary and assistant to Leopold Trepper and liaised between Léon Grossvogel and Henry Robinson in matters relating to the running of the French covert black market trading company Simex. Katz had a number of aliases that he used to disguise his identity, including Andre Dubois, Rene and Le Petite Andre.

== Life ==
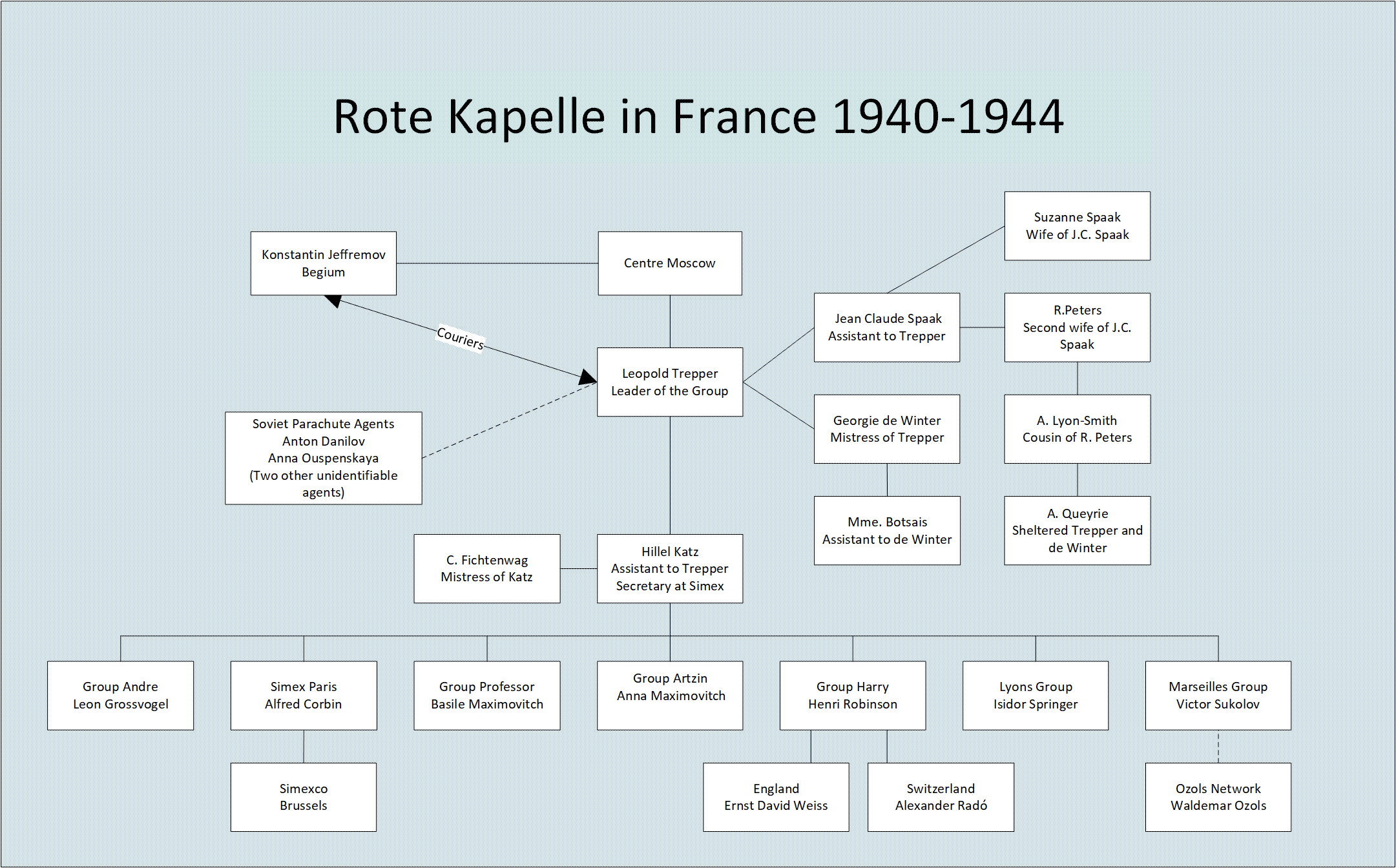
This diagrams details the seven networks of the Rote Kapelle in France between 1940 and 1944. Katz was central to the running of the networks.

Katz was a communist activist who met Trepper in Palestine, where his parents had settled. His father was a teacher. Katz moved to Toulouse in France, where he met and became the lover of Cécile Fichten, an activist member of the Mouvement Jeunes Communistes de France. Together the couple had two children.

He had a brother, Joseph Katz who held British citizenship. Joseph Katz was instrumental in establishing the Lyon safehouse that was established in 1937.

== Red Orchestra ==
When he moved to Paris, Katz concealed his Jewish origins and legalised himself as a Frenchman under the name Andre Dubois. In Paris, Katz was one of the two main assistants to Trepper, along with Leon Grossvogel. Katz was totally dedicated, both to Trepper and the Communist cause. Trepper described him in a quote as: A mason, he knows how to handle the trowel and build a house.

Katz was particularly interested in educational reform, specifically in the modern and anti-authoritarian approach advocated by Célestin Freinet as well as the works of Maria Montessori. Katz devoted his spare time to the groups of young people that lived in Vitry-sur-Seine, where he organised hiking via the Camping and Culture Association ("Association Camping et Culture").

During the late 1930s, Katz lived at 13 Quai Saint-Michel in Paris, where he was a member of the communist section of the 5th arrondissement of Paris. During that period, Katz worked in a Racine bookshop where he managed the Youth fund. The book shop was popular with militants and political refugees.

In September 1939, Katz enlisted in the French Foreign Legion. He was captured and taken prisoner in June 1940 during the German advance, but managed to escape with Aldred Corbin by swimming across the River Somme. After his escape, Katz started to use the alias André Dubois. Corbin would become a chicken breeder and inventor of poultry feed. Katz would later recruit him for the Trepper group, to store a radio transmitter in Giverny where his poultry farm was located. Corbin would later become the commercial director of Simex.

== Operations ==
Katz was always cheerful and his direct and frank approach combined with his optimistic demeanour garnered him many friends. These were useful in his work as a recruiter, while he worked at Simex, that enabled him to build relationships using his extensive contacts, to look for people who were Communists or favourably deposed to the group's work. Katz, who knew many of Trepper's contacts and acquaintances, carried out many of Trepper operations personally.

== Arrest ==
On 25 November 1942, Trepper was arrested by Gestapo officer Karl Giering and immediately offered to collaborate with the Abwehr. On 2 December 1942, Hillel Katz was arrested.

According to the report that was written by Gestapo officer Heinz Pannwitz (sources vary), it was Trepper himself who betrayed Katz by phoning Katz up and arranging a meeting at the Madeleine metro station in Paris, in what was a trap by the Gestapo. Trepper allegedly gave up the names and addresses of most of the members of his own network, the first people he betrayed were Katz and Grossvogel. However, according to Gestapo officer Hans Reiser, it was Abraham Rajchmann, a member of the group, and an Abwehr informer, who told Reiser where Katz would likely be staying.

Katz was moved to a house belonging to Karl Bömelburg at 40 boulevard Victor Hugo, Neuilly-sur-Seine at Trepper's insistence. Trepper informed Katz of his plan to escape from Neuilly, but Katz refused to follow as his wife and children were being held as hostages.

On 13 September 1943, Trepper escaped Gestapo custody under watch while visiting a pharmacy. After Trepper escaped, Katz was taken to the Rue des Sausasaies in Paris and tortured to determine if he knew anything of the escape plan, but he never betrayed Trepper. After Trepper's escape, Katz disappeared. It is not known what happened to him but he was likely tried at a Luftwaffe court martial, presided over by Judge Advocate Manfred Roeder and then either likely shot or deported to a concentration camp, as happened to many other people associated with the Red Orchestra in France.

== See also ==
- Red Orchestra ("Rote Kapelle")
- People of the Red Orchestra
