= Anatoly Gurevich =

Russian spy

Anatoly Markovich Gurevich
- Anatoly Gurevich as a young man
- Born: 7 November 1913; Kharkov, Russian Empire
- Died: 2 January 2009 (aged 95); Saint Petersburg, Russian Federation
- Education: Leningrad Institute of Railway Transport, GRU intelligence school
- Occupation: Intelligence agent
- Espionage activity
- Allegiance: Soviet Main Intelligence Directorate
- Service years: 1939–1945
- Codename: Vincente Sierra; Victor Sukolov; Arthus Barcza; Simon Urwith; Fritz; Dupuis; Lebrun; Manolo

Anatoly Markovich Gurevich (Russian: Анатолий Маркович Гуревич; 7 November 1913 – 2 January 2009) was a Soviet intelligence officer. He was an officer in the GRU operating as "разведчик-нелегал" (razvedchik-nelegal, illegal resident spy) in Soviet intelligence parlance. Gurevich was a central figure in the anti-Nazi Red Orchestra in France and Belgium during World War II.

Gurevich had a number of aliases that he used to disguise his identity, including Vincente Sierra, Victor Sukolov, Arthus Barcza and Simon Urwith. He also used a number of code names for radio communications, including Kent, Fritz, Manolo, Dupuis and Lebrun. Gurevich ran one of the seven groups of networks, located in Belgium that were controlled by Leopold Trepper in France. He was the second leading Soviet agent in Europe during the war years. Upon his return to the Soviet Union in 1945, Gurevich was sentenced for treason and spent 15 years in detention and was rehabilitated in 1990.

== Life ==
Gurevich was born into a Jewish family in Kharkov. Both his father and his mother were pharmacists. From 1929 to 1933, he was a member of the paramilitary sports organisation called OSOAVIAKHIM. After that, he was a part of the air defence and later took a communication operator course.

In 1933, he enrolled at the Leningrad Institute of Railway Transport where he displayed proficiency for learning languages and translation. He learnt German, French, and English there. On 1 September 1935, he was appointed to a course for training people at the Intourist travel agency. When the Spanish Civil War began, Gurevich volunteered to help. Along with a large group he travelled to Spain and arrived at Cartagena on 30 December 1937. He was appointed as an adjunct translator on submarine C-4 of the Second Spanish Republic, Spanish Republican Navy. In Autumn 1938, Gurevich returned to Moscow. In 1939, he underwent training in the intelligence school of the Main Intelligence Directorate in Moscow.

== Soviet agent ==
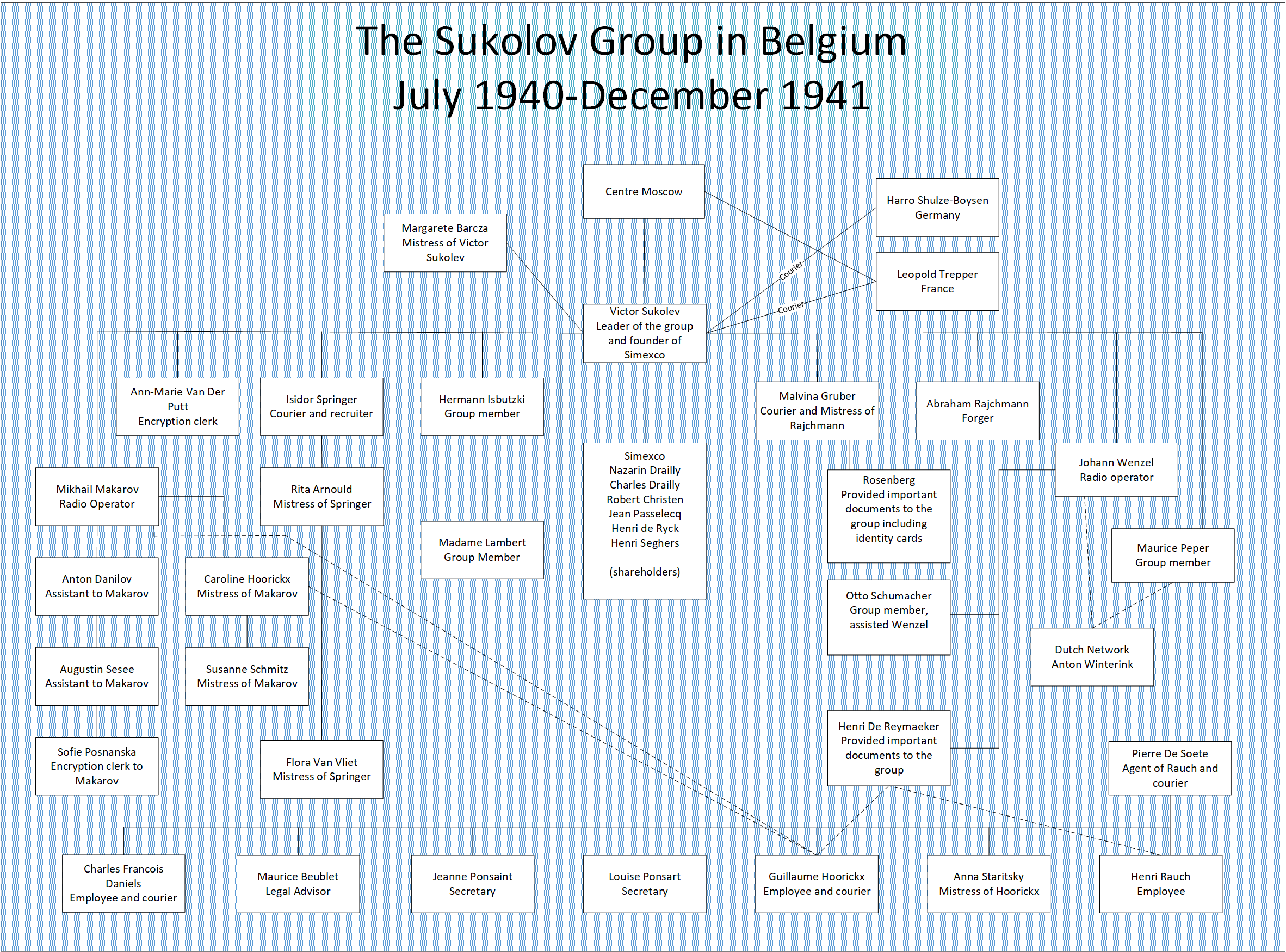
Organisational diagram of members of the Sukolov espionage group

On 15 April 1938, Gurevich was ordered by the Soviet Main Intelligence Directorate to travel to France to commence his work as an agent. Disguised as a Mexican tourist, he travelled through Finland, Sweden, Norway and the Netherlands, before finally arriving in France. In Paris, Gurevich changed his passport from a Mexican tourist into a Uruguayan passport. In the same month, he carried out his first operation when he was instructed to travel to Berlin to contact the Luftwaffe officer Harro Schulze-Boysen. Gurevich was ordered to re-establish Shulze-Boysen as an intelligence source and arrange a courier service. Sukolov was given the telephone number of Schulze-Boysen and been ordered to phone him and arrange a meeting somewhere in the city. He was not to meet him at his home, however. When Gurevich phoned, Libertas Schulze-Boysen, the wife of Harro Schulze-Boysen answered. They met on the platform of an underground station, later moving to a cafe where Schulze-Boysen joined them later.

In July 1939, Gurevich, posing as the wealthy Vincente Sierra, arrived in Brussels while travelling on a Uruguayan passport that had been issued in New York City on 17 April 1936. The passport gave the holders date and place of birth as 3 July 1911 in Montevideo and his permanent address was Calle Colon 9, Montevideo. On 17 July 1939, Sukolov made contact with Leopold Trepper in Ghent, who at the time was head of the Soviet intelligence network in Belgium. Trepper planned to teach the operation of the Foreign Excellent Raincoat Company to Gurevich. To make contacts in different strata of society, Gurevich started to familiarize himself with Belgium society and studied the country to enable the collection of economic knowledge. Gurevich took part in ballroom dancing and riding lessons and as he travelled between luxury hotels, mail bearing the stamps of Uruguay awaited his arrival. To improve his language skills in French, English and German, Gurevich enrolled at the Free University of Brussels.

Gurevich's cryptonym or code name was Kent. His colleagues in Brussels had no idea where the code name has come from, in fact it was the name of fictional British agent character in a book that Gurevich had read when he was a boy called Diary of a spy by N G Smirnov. Although he was industrious, he was generally disliked for a number of reasons, which included being arrogant, and was considered a bit of a bluffer who was known for his socialising and profligate spending which included owning 40 luxury suits in his large apartment in Avenue AJ Sleggers. Trepper viewed both Gurevich and Mikhail Makarov as the Young Guard and considered both himself and his immediate colleagues including Hillel Katz, the Old Guard Sukolov had never been tested in battle.

Gurevich's original instructions were to establish an espionage network in Copenhagen, but in the months leading up to the war, Trepper's plans changed with Sukolov having to be introduced into the Belgian network gradually. He eventually ended up working as an assistant to Trepper and performed the normal bureaucratic operations of an espionage network as a cypher clerk, deciphering instructions from Soviet intelligence, preparing reports from information forwarded from a contact in the Soviet Trade Representation of Belgium.

In October 1939, Gurevich visited Daan Goulooze, the director of the Communist Party of the Netherlands (CPN), as a contact to the CPN to build his network and to request assistance. Gurevich asked that a temporary wireless telegraphy link be established for his use and this was provided by Goulooze and used until January 1940. In July 1940, Gurevich again visited Goulooze to request the reserve code that he had received from Soviet intelligence the year before.

After the invasion of the Netherlands which ended on 14 May 1940, Gurevich anticipated no difficulties in travelling incognito as a Uruguayan student.

Between March and April 1940, Gurevich made a three-week business trip to Switzerland to meet Alexander Radó, a Rote Drei agent to deliver $3000 to finance the Swiss network. During this period, Gurevich was passing intelligence from Schulze-Boysen through his WT station in Brussels.

== Greta Barcza ==
In May 1940, Gurevich met Margarete (or Marguerite) "Greta" Barcza, the daughter of a Czech millionaire. During the invasion of Belgium when Brussels was being heavily bombed, Barcza met Gurevich while cowering in the cellars at 106 Avenue Émile de Beco in Brussels. Gurevich lived in the same building and one floor above Barcza. At the time, Gurevich was still posing as Uruguayan Vincent Sierra and over several weeks they formed a relationship and eventually became lovers, becoming inseparable which eventually impacted Gurevich's espionage work. In Treppers view, Barcza was a bad influence on Gurevich.

In July 1940, when Trepper had to move to France to flee the German advance and start a new French network, he turned the Belgian network over to Gurevich. Gurevich, operating from a safehouse located at 101 Rue des Atrébates in Brussels, used Makarov as his wireless radio operator, Zofia Poznańska as his cipher clerk, Rita Arnould as a courier and housekeeper, and Isidor Springer, who worked as a courier between Gurevich and Trepper and as a recruiter. Gurevich reorganised the network and from that point only referred to Trepper on points of policy. When the Raincoat Company was sequestered by German soldiers during the invasion into Belgium on 17 May 1940 as Grossvogel was Jewish, Gurevich started work to create a replacement organisation. Known as Simexco, it was a joint-stock company to be used as a cover for espionage work and was established by March 1941. The firm was established as a genuine business and was even granted telephone and fax facilities by the German authorities providing a regular and privileged way to enable Trepper and Gurevich to communicate.

In June 1941, Trepper sent Anton Danilov to assist Makarov with radio transmissions. In September or October 1941, Trepper ordered Abraham Rajchmann, a Polish career criminal and forger, to join Gurevich On 18 October 1941, among other assignments, Gurevich was ordered to contact the Harnack/Schulze-Boysen group to restore the connection between the Main Intelligence Directorate and the group. He was ordered to visit Hans Coppi that was the groups' radio operator but was unable to repair the radio. On 13 December 1941, the Gestapo arrested Gurevich's WT operator Anton Danilov in an apartment at 101 rue des Attrebates, Etterbeek in Brussels and Trepper happened to be in Brussels at the time, found out and warned Gurevich of the arrest. Gurevich's first concern was to arrange for Barcza to leave Belgium for France to ensure she was safe. Gurevich arranged travel documents with Rajchmann. Barcza and her son Rene arrived in France in late December 1941. Gurevich himself hid in the house of Nazarin Drailly, an agent of the Gurevich group, to evade the Gestapo, while Gurevich made arrangements to transfer ownership of the Simexco espionage organisation to Drailly.

In the summer of 1942, Trepper evolved a plan to get Barcza to Switzerland and live out the rest of the war but it was rejected by Gurevich. At the same time, Gurevich was increasingly finding himself in arguments with Trepper. By that point, he was no longer part of the Soviet espionage network, was defeatist in his outlook and started to offer reasons why he was no longer using his transmitter. Trepper eventually had to call in two radio specialists to check the radio and found it in perfect working order. In January 1942, Trepper ordered Gurevich to travel to Marseille and establish a new branch office of Simex.

== Arrest ==
On 9 November 1942, Gurevich was arrested with Margaret in his apartment at 75 Rue Abbé de l'Épée in Marseille by the French police. Gurevich was handed over to German Police and then on the order of the person who was head of the Gestapo in France, Karl Bömelburg, was fetched by a truck from Marseille and taken to a house in Rue des Saussaies in Paris. He was subsequently moved to Fort Breendonk in Belgium then taken to be interrogated by the Reich Security Main Office (RSHA) in Prince Albertstrasse, Berlin.

== Funkspiel ==
Gurevich told the Germans that he had not been active as a professional agent for some time and had tried to create a new life for himself and Margaret Barcza in Marseille. He stated that he knew before his arrest that he was being surveilled at his Marseille address and the reason that he had not fled was that no longer considered himself part of the Rote Kapelle. Although he showed a readiness to work for the Germans there was still a great distrust of Gurevich amongst his interrogators. However, Gurevich was continually brought into the office of the Gestapo for further interrogation, where over several days he managed to convince them that he was genuine. Gurevich laid out a plan to the Gestapo to get back in touch with the Russian intelligence service and enable playbacks to commence which the Gestapo accepted. Playbacks, the British term or the American term, G-V Game or Funkspiel as it was known in Germany was the transmission of controlled information over a captured agent's radio so that the agent's parent service had no knowledge that the agent had turned. Although Gurevich decided to cooperate on the funkspiel, he refused to name any agents he had recruited. To initiate the funkspiel, it is believed Gurevich sent a letter to the Red Army intelligence via the Soviet consulate in Sofia but it is not known how a reply was sent by the Soviets. Once he made contact with Red Army intelligence, the strict discipline under which he was held was relaxed and he was allowed visits by his wife Margaret.

On 4 January 1943, Gurevich was returned to Fresnes Prison in France where he began the playback operation. However, he took up so much time enciphering and deciphering the messages that he was moved back to the house on Rue des Saussaies in Paris, where he was given a cell next to Trepper. The ciphering undertaken by Gurevich was checked at first by Gestapo officer Waldemar Lentz and then later by Hans Kurfess. The book that Gurevich used to cipher his messages was believed to be French novel containing stories about Corsica called Mérimée, possibly a book by the French novelist Prosper Mérimée who wrote a number of novellas set in Corsica. During the playback operation, the Gestapo found that Gurevich was both praised and criticised by Soviet intelligence but although he was requested to provide military intelligence about the Wehrmacht, the Gestapo found it impossible to supply even the most innocuous material. By March 1943, Gurevich was effectively part of the Sonderkommando Rote Kapelle, the RSHA counter-intelligence unit.

In July 1943 Gurevich and Margaret were moved to a new apartment at 40 Boulevard Victor Hugo, Neuilly-sur-Seine in Paris. Trepper joined them at the apartment. They were allowed to walk about Paris without a guard.

== Ozols ==
By early 1943, Red Army intelligence had little doubt that Gurevich had been arrested and was now a double agent. Surprisingly, on 14 March 1943, during the funkspiel, Gurevich received a message from Soviet intelligence that instructed him to activate a former Latvian general Voldemārs Ozols who was a Red Army intelligence agent. Ozols was a principal-agent in Gurevich's network and together were successful in penetrating French Resistance. The Soviets believed that Ozols would be able to furnish information about German troop movements, so Ozols was reactivated by Sukolov in July 1943, by speaking a pre-arranged word. Ozols hadn't been active since July 1941 and wasn't informed that Gurevich was working for the Germans. Gurevich ordered Ozols to reassemble his network with the remnants of his old network and recruit new members where needed. By December 1943, Ozols had made contact with Paul Legendre, a reserve captain who was chief of the Mithridate network that was located in the Marseille region. Consequently, the Mithridate network was under the control of the Sonderkommando. Amongst the agents that Legendre recruited were Maurice Viollette and the Mayor of Dreux.

Initially, the Germans used the Mithridate network to manipulate the French resistance and in particular the French Communist Party but in spring 1944, Pannwitz decided to use the network to communicate to Gestapo agents who were working behind enemy lines and use Gurevich as a proxy to pass information between the network and the Gestapo.

== Retreat ==
Gurevich continued to act as a proxy to Ozols and the Mithridate network until the summer of 1944. Around the same time Gurevich moved from Neuilly-sur-Seine into Pannwitz's villa, located close to the Arc de Triomphe in Paris. As a result of his successes with Ozols, Sukolov made increasing demands on the Germans. One of these was to send Greta Barcza's son to a school in Paris and the Sonderkommando to pay the school fees.

After the Normandy landings and the subsequent retreat of German forced in autumn 1944, the Sonderkommando Rote Kapelle of the RSHA was reduced in strength. Pannwitz took over the running of the Sonderkommando. On 16 August 1944 Pannwitz took Gurevich and Barcza away from Paris when the Sonderkommando was forced to withdraw. Gurevich continued his playbacks under the leadership of Pannwitz and a station was established somewhere in Alsace to continue the playback operation. After Barcza gave birth to Gurevich's son in November 1944, Gurevich and Barcza were forced to separate by Pannwitz. Gurevich was sent to Berlin to receive orders on whether to continue the playbacks with Pannwitz and this was the last time that Barcza saw him.

In April 1945, Gurevich and Pannwitz were seen close to Lake Constance. They continued the playbacks from various locations until May 1945.

== USSR ==
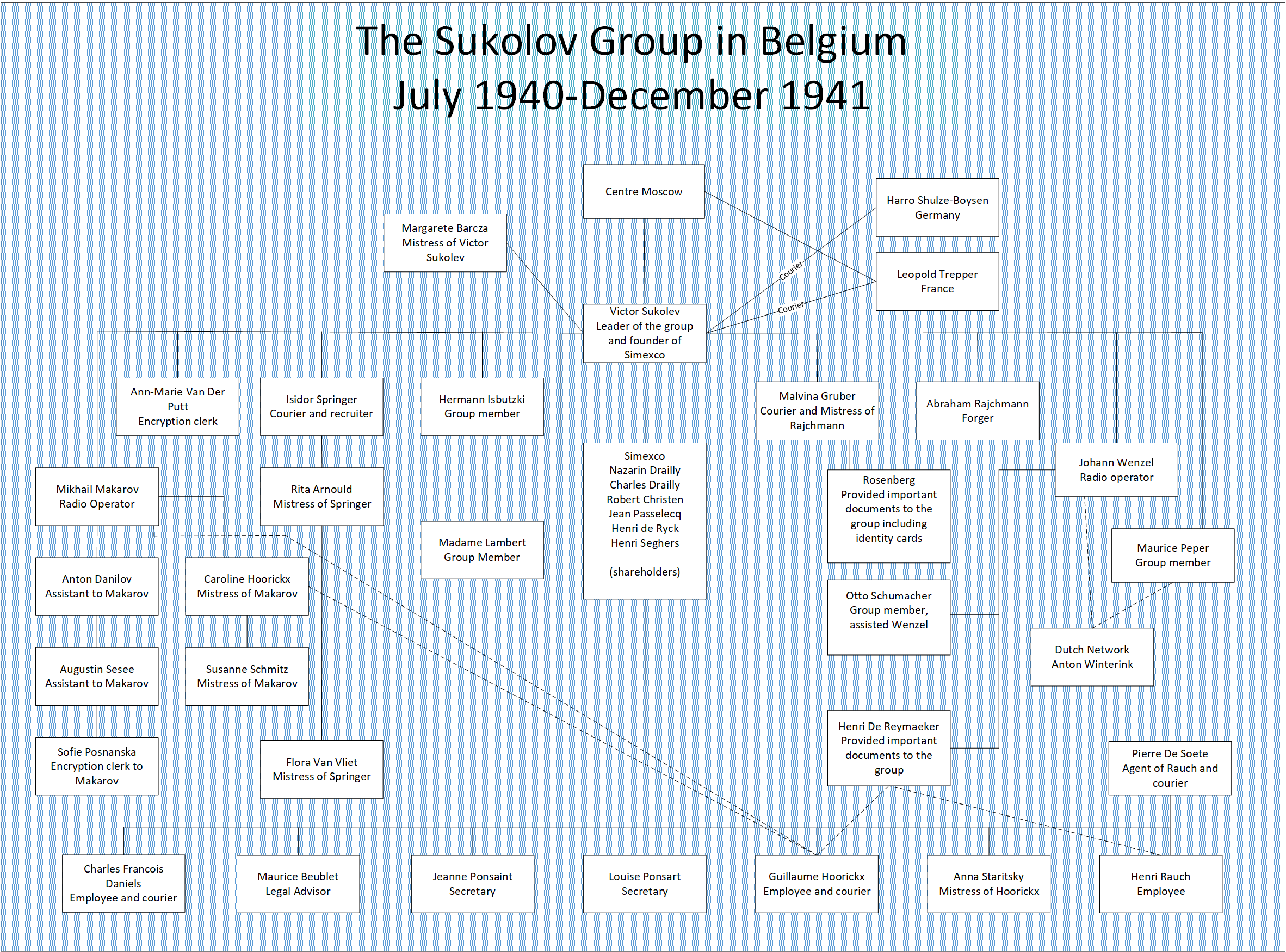
Organisational diagram of the Sukolov Group in Belgium between July 1940 and December 1941

In April 1945, Gurevich was located in Bregenz. On 3 May 1945, he was captured by French forces in a hut on a mountain near Bludenz, Vorarlberg, Austria, along with Heinz Pannwitz. Gurevich and Pannwitz were taken to Paris for interrogation. Sukolov told the interrogators that he was an officer in the Russian Intelligence Service. On a flight organised by Colonel Novikov of the Soviet Military Mission on 7 June 1945, Gurevich, along with Pannwitz and Gurevich's secretary Emma Kemp, flew to Moscow. Gurevich took along a package of documents that constituted the archives that the Gestapo had compiled on the Red Orchestra.

In Moscow, they were all arrested and locked up in the Lubyanka. Gurevich was accused of high treason. He was questioned for a long time by Viktor Abakumov, who ransacked the records of the interrogations that Gurevich had reported. In January 1947, Gurevich was sentenced to 20 years jail for treason, under Article 58-1a, and was imprisoned in Vorkutlag and Rechlag from January 1948 to October 1955.

He initially worked as a labourer in the PGS camp, and then in the planning and production department (PPCh) of this camp, the camp at mine No. 18 and as a senior economist at PPCh at the 8th mine in Vorkutlag, later in Rechlag as an economist in the camp unit (lagotdelenie) at mine No. 40 (until August 1951), in camp unit (lagotdelenie) No. 3 (SHU-2: mines No. 12, 14 and 16). After the Vorkuta uprising in July-August 1953, he was transferred to a punishment camp for 3 months (the reasons for the punishment are unclear, since, according to Gurevich, he did not take an active part in the rebellion). He was transferred to lagotdelenie No. 5 (at mine No. 40) from there, where he worked at the research permafrost station (VNIMS) of the Institute of Permafrost Science of the USSR Academy of Sciences since November 1953.

== Exonerated ==
Anatoly Gurevich in old age.

By 1991, Gurevich was fully exonerated and released. It was established that Gurevich had been imprisoned because he had married his mistress, Margarete (or Marguerite) Barcza, without the permission of Russian intelligence. The accusation by Red Army Intelligence was that Gurevich had abandoned his mission in Marseille after becoming thoroughly influenced by western living, which had led to his supposed defection.

Gurevich lost trace of Barcza and their young son, Michael. The NKVD told him they had died in a concentration camp during a bombing raid. In fact, for a number of years after the war ended, Barcza had searched for Gurevich. On 29 November 1990, Gurevich learned that Barcza had survived the camp and died in 1985, and that his son was alive and living in Spain. In February 1991, Gurevich met his son and grandson in Leningrad.

== Bibliography ==
- Gurevich, A. M. (1995). Un certain monsieur Kent [A certain Mr. Kent] (in French). Paris: B. Grasset. ISBN 9782246463313. OCLC 33444209.

== Filmography ==
The following films were made where Gurevich was a character.

- Verlorenes Leben - Hans Coppi und der letzte Agent der Roten Kapelle (Lost life - Hans Coppi and the last agent of the Red Orchestra) was released in 1996. Hans Coppi Junior filmed a documentary about Gurevich.
- L'orchestre Rouge (The Red Orchestra) by Jacques Rouffio was released in 1989. Martin Lamotte played Gurevich under the codename Kent.
