= Mikhail Makarov (spy) =

Soviet agent of the Red Orchestra, alias Alamo (1915–c. 1942)

- Soviet GRU officer, Mikhail Makarov
- Born: 2 January 1915; Petrograd
- Died: circa 1942 (aged 26); Plötzensee Prison, Berlin
- Occupation: Soviet intelligence officer
- Organization: GRU
- Known for: Member of the Red Orchestra ("Rote Kapelle")

Mikhail Varfolomeevich Makarov (2 January 1915 – c. 1942) was a Russian national and career Soviet GRU officer with rank of lieutenant, who was one of the organizers of a Soviet intelligence network in Belgium and Netherlands, that was later called the Red Orchestra by the Abwehr. His aliases were Alamo, Carlos Alamo and Chemnitz. In March 1939, Makarov became associated with Leopold Trepper, a Soviet intelligence agent who would later run a large espionage network in Europe. Makarov was captured on the 13 December 1941 by the Abwehr and later executed in Plötzensee Prison in 1942.

== Life ==
Makarov was born into a poor family and lost his father at an early age. He went to school in his hometown for seven years and then studied French and Spanish at the Moscow State Linguistic University. He initially worked as a translator. and after the first delivery of the Polikarpov I-16 fighter planes to the Spanish Republic on 31 October 1936, Makarov was sent to Spain to be employed as an interpreter in the Spanish Republican Air Force. He was trained as gunner and took part in combat operations. In 1937 he returned to the Soviet Union and 1938 began training as an intelligence officer with a special additional instruction on the techniques of forging, achieving the rank of lieutenant. On 16 October 1936, Makarov received a Uruguayan passport to travel incognito. The passport had been issued in New York under the cover name of Carlos Alamo who was born in Montevideo on 12 April 1913.

In March 1939, Makarov was ordered to travel to Belgium, via Stockholm, Copenhagen and Paris to meet and assist Leopold Trepper. Makorov was supplied with ten-thousand dollars in expenses to facilitate espionage work. In Brussels, he married Alexandra Petrowa, née Schmidt or Schmitz.

Makarov initial purpose was to provide expertise in secret inks and forged documentation e.g. preparing Kennkartes for the group, but Trepper's assistant Léon Grossvogel, had recruited Abraham Rajchmann, a known criminal, informer, a specialist in forging and the most unreliable of agents. Makarov was trained in wireless telegraphy and cipher techniques by Johann Wenzel. In November 1939, Rajchmann was assigned to work with Makarov, as the forger. Trepper arranged for Makarov to become managing director of a branch of the Foreign Excellent Raincoat Company in Ostend as means of providing cover, while Makarov established a radio transmitter, to communicate with Soviet agents in Great Britain. Makarov lived together with Caroline Hoorickx, the divorced wife of Guillaume Hoorickx, while he was in Ostend.

After the Battle of Belgium in May 1940, Leopold Trepper began to find his position in Belgium untenable and fled to Paris in July 1940. In Trepper's absence, Soviet agent Anatoly Gurevich took over leadership of the Belgian network with Makarov, now established in Brussels at his radio operator, who had returned to Brussels when his building containing the business was bombed.

In the summer of 1941, Belgian communist and Soviet Red Army Lieutenant Anton Danilov became an assistant radio operator to Makarov in a base the group had established in a house at 101 Rue des Atrebates in Brussels. Along with Danilov in the house was run by German Rita Arnould nee Bloch, who was courier and housewife along with Polish antifascist Zofia Poznańska, the cipher clerk.

== Discovery ==
On 26 June 1941, the Funkabwehr intercepted a number of radio messages. It took some months of work for the Funkabwehr to identify where the transmitter was located, but on 30 November 1941 the close range direction-finding teams moved into Brussels and almost immediately found three transmitter signals. The Abwehr chose a location at 101 Rue des Atrébates, that provided the strongest signal and on 12 December 1941 2 pm, the house was raided by the Abwehr. Everybody inside the house was arrested. Danilov was in the process of transmitting. He was seriously injured while being arrested and refused to cooperate. Arnould became an informer, Poznanska committed suicide in Saint-Gilles prison after being tortured. The next day Makarov turned up at the house and was arrested. Trepper also visited the house, but his documentation was so authentic that he was released.

According to Belgian police records, Makarov was imprisoned in Saint-Gilles prison, sentenced to death and executed in 1942 in Plötzensee Prison. In another report, Makarov was sentenced to death by court-martial but his execution was stayed as he was the nephew of Vyacheslav Molotov. His fate is unknown.

== Bibliography ==
- Coppi Jr., Hans (July 1996). Dietrich Bracher, Karl; Schwarz, Hans-Peter; Möller, Horst (eds.). "Die Rote Kapelle" [The Red Orchestra in the field of conflict and intelligence activity, The Trepper Report June 1943] (PDF). Quarterly Books for Contemporary History (in German). 44 (3). Munich: Institute of Contemporary History. ISSN 0042-5702. Archived from the original (PDF) on 18 May 2015.
- Schafranek, Hans (2004). Tuchel, Johannes (ed.). Krieg im Äther : Widerstand und Spionage im Zweiten Weltkrieg (in German). Wien: Picus. ISBN 9783854524700. OCLC 237838542.
- Perrault, Gilles (1990). Auf den Spuren der Roten Kapelle [On the traces of the Red Orchestra]. Vienna: Europaverl. ISBN 3-203-51232-7. OCLC 75468124.
