= Foreign Excellent Raincoat Company =

The Foreign Excellent Raincoat Company was the name of the Brussels company that was established in December 1938, by Polish-French Jewish businessman and ardent communist, Léon Grossvogel on behalf of Red Army Intelligence spy Leopold Trepper, as a cover organisation for Soviet espionage operations in Europe during Nazi Germany. The espionage network was later named as the Red Orchestra by the Abwehr.

== Company ==
In the autumn of 1938, Leopold Trepper made contact with Grossvogel, whom he had known while he was in Palestine in the 1920s. At the time, Grossvogel managed a business called Roi de Caoutchouc or The Raincoat King in Brussels, on behalf of its owners. He had been employed by the firm since 1929 and eventually became the commercial director of its foreign subsidiary The Excellent Raincoat Company in 1935. In 1937, his job position changed when he became the travelling inspector for the company. Although Grossvogel was related to one of the owners by marriage and who recognised him as a good worker, he had become unpopular with his employees due to his communist sympathies and his errant behaviour during a strike at their Brussels plant in 1938. They were relieved when he suggested that he was planning to establish an independent subsidiary of The Raincoat King, to increase profits.

Trepper had a plan to create a business that would be the export division of The Raincoat King and agreed with Grossvogel the plan for a new business, without telling Grossvogel of his own plans. Trepper considered it the ideal cover for an espionage network. Trepper's plan was to wait until the company gained market share, and then when it was of sufficient size, infiltrate it with communist personal in positions such shareholders, business managers and department heads.

Trepper financed Grossvogel to the sum of $8000 to create the new business, that was given an unidiomatic name of The Foreign Excellent Raincoat Company. while his employees supplied the other half of the funding, around $8000-$1000. In December 1938, Grossvogel formed the new company and became commercial director of the new firm. The other directors of the firm were his brother-in-law, Louis Kapolowitz, former Belgian consul, Jules Jaspar and two other Belgian businessman. Jasper's brother, Henri Jaspar was the former prime minister of Belgium, so Jaspar was seen as the ideal person to direct the company, providing it with a veneer of respectability. The business operated in the open and local regulations were followed to the letter. Contact with local government officials were maintained to ensure a veneer of respectability.

At the same time in 1939, Grossvogel spent most of the year travelling around seven major sea ports that were trading with the United Kingdom to establish branches of company and putting in agents to run them. The ports were at Oslo, Stockholm, Copenhagen, Hamburg, Wilhelmshaven, Ostend and Boulogne. However, owing to local regulations it was difficult to create the type of branch office that was required. In fact, only one branch was created in Stockholm.

In March 1939, in a plan created by Trepper, Grossvogel arranged for Red Army Intelligence agent Mikhail Makarov to become manager of a branch of the raincoat company in Ostend, replacing Grossvogel wife. Makarov planned to put a transmitter in the city, to establish communication with an agent in England. During the Conquest by the Belgium in May 1940, the Ostend branch of the Raincoat Company was bombed by the Luftwaffe.
