= Zofia Poznańska =

Polish-Jewish WW2 resistance fighter (1906–1942)

- Zofia Poznańska taken in Brussels in 1933
- Born: 23 February 1906; Łódź, Congress Poland
- Died: 29 September 1942 (aged 36); Saint-Gilles Prison, Brussels, German-occupied Belgium
- Occupations: Cipher clerk, agent of GRU
- Years active: 1933-1942

Zofia Poznańska, also known as Zosia, Zosha, or Sophia (8 June 1906 – 29 September 1942) was a Polish antifascist and resistance fighter of the Soviet-affiliated espionage group that the German Abwehr intelligence service later called the "Red Orchestra".

== Life ==
Zofia Poznańska was born in Łódź, Congress Poland, Russian Empire, into the prosperous Jewish family of Mosze Poznański and Hana Poznańska, née Basz. She later grew up in Kalisz, after Poland regained its independence in 1918. As a youth she was a member of Hashomer Hatzair, a secular Labor Zionist youth movement. In 1925, when she was 19, Poznańska emigrated to Palestine to live and work at the Mishmar HaEmek kibbutz, laying gravel to create roads. After becoming disillusioned with the kibbutz and struggling to reconcile her Labor Zionist politics with the displacement of Arab farmers, whose land was being purchased, Poznańska moved to Tel Aviv. There she met Leopold Trepper and joined his Communist cell, the Ihud movement. In 1927 Poznańska joined the Palestine Communist Party.

She returned to Poland on learning that her sister had fallen seriously ill. When she returned to Palestine, she found that the Ihud had been suppressed by the British authorities, and she eventually moved to Paris, where she was also active in the communist movement. After French police began to put pressure on communists, she moved to Brussels.

She was the cipher expert in a spy cell run by Trepper under a false Belgian identity as "Anna Verlinden". In October 1941 Poznańska was sent to Brussels to be a cipher clerk to Soviet GRU intelligence agent and radio operator Mikhail Makarov. Poznańska lived with housewife and courier Rita Arnould at 101 Rue des Atrébates, in Etterbeek, Brussels.

She was arrested by Abwehr officer Harry Piepe (Note: Harry Piepe uses the alias Franz Fortner in Gilles Perrault's The Red Orchestra.) on the night of 12–13 December 1941. Poznańska was one of the first to be arrested by the Abwehr. Poznańska committed suicide by hanging on 29 September 1942 in Saint-Gilles prison, Brussels, so that the cipher she was entrusted with would not fall into German hands. However her sacrifice was largely in a vain, as Wilhelm Vauck, principal cryptographer of the Funkabwehr was able to piece together clues provided by several pieces of paper discovered in the house, that the code used message encipherment that was based on a chequerboard cypher with a book key, a form of substitution cipher. The courier Rita Arnould who was arrested by the Abwehr on the same day, recalled the agents regularly read the same books and was able to identify the name of the book key as Le miracle du Professeur Wolmar by Guy de Téramond, an obscure 1910 novel.

== Legacy ==
In 2003, Israeli writer Yehudit Kafri published a biographical novel about Poznańska, Zosha: From the Jezreel Valley to the Red Orchestra (Jerusalem, Keter, 2003, ISBN 9789650711795), later published in Poland in English translation by Anne Hartstein Pace (Toruń, Wydawnictwo Adam Marszałek, 2009, ISBN 9788376113388), which was republished as Codename: Zosha (CreateSpace, 2014, ISBN 978-1503162365). Kafri writes in the opening: "The characters in this story are not fictitious. As for their actions, thoughts and feelings - some occurred and some could have occurred." She dedicates the English translation to Anna Orgal, who died in the 2003 Davidka Square bus bombing.

Poznańska is buried in a mass grave at Saint-Gilles, Belgium, where a tombstone bearing the inscription Resistante, with her name, was erected in 1985. In Israel, a grove was dedicated to her in 1983 in Eshtaol Forest, and she was posthumously awarded a Fighters against Nazis Medal.
