= Lugny-Champagne =

- Commune
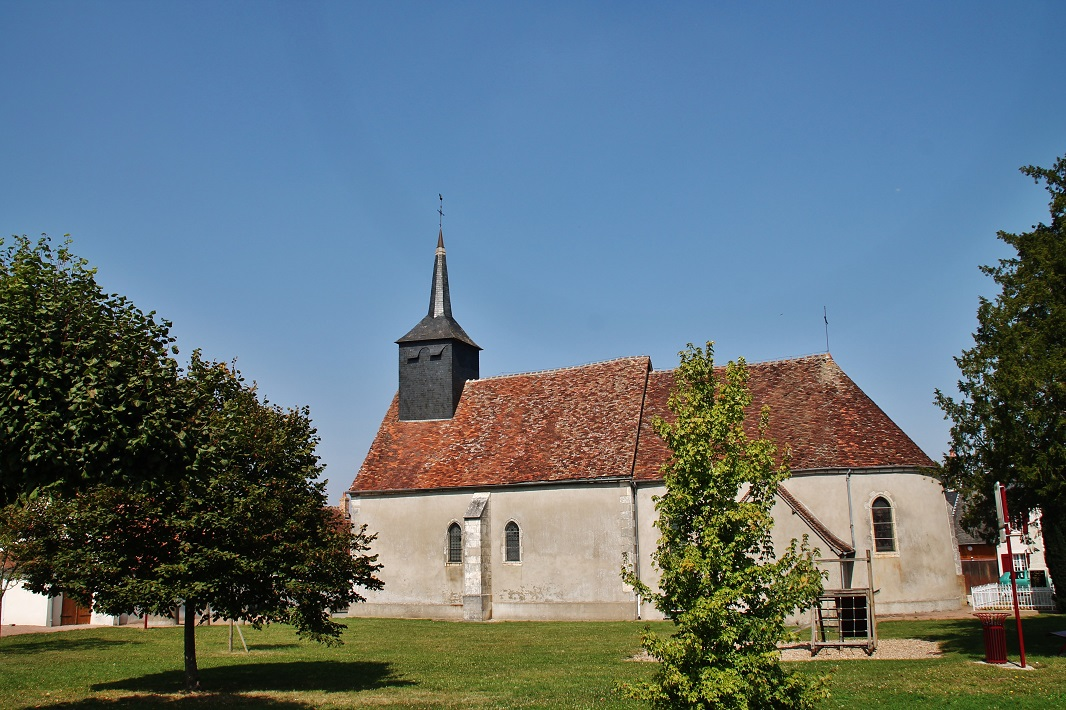
- The church of Saint-Fiacre, in Lugny-Champagne
- Location of Lugny-Champagne
- Location within France Location within Centre-Val de Loire
- Coordinates: 47°11′13″N 2°49′21″E
- Country: France
- Region: Centre-Val de Loire
- Department: Cher
- Arrondissement: Bourges
- Canton: Avord

Government
  - Mayor (2020–2026): Yves Debono
- Area^{1}: 29.54 km^{2} (11.41 sq mi)
- Elevation: 180 m (590 ft)
- Highest elevation: 204 m (669 ft)
- Lowest elevation: 162 m (531 ft)
- Population (2023): 142
  - Density: 4.81/km^{2} (12.5/sq mi)
- Time zone: UTC+01:00 (CET)
  - Summer (DST): UTC+02:00 (CEST)
- INSEE/Postal code: 18132 /18140
- ^{1} French Land Register data, which excludes lakes, ponds, glaciers > 1 km^{2} (0.386 sq mi or 247 acres) and river estuaries.

Lugny-Champagne (French pronunciation: [lyɲi ʃɑ̃paɲ]) is a commune in the Cher department in the Centre-Val de Loire region of France.

== Geography ==
Lugny-Champagne is a farming area comprising a small village and several hamlets situated in the valley of the river Ragnon, some 22 miles (35 km) northeast of Bourges, at the junction of the D10, D187, D25 and the D51 roads.

== Population ==
Historical population
Year	Pop.	±% p.a.
1968	321	—
1975	275	−2.19%
1982	221	−3.07%
1990	207	−0.81%
1999	166	−2.42%
2007	178	+0.88%
2012	153	−2.98%
2017	142	−1.48%
2023	142	+0.00%
Source: INSEE

== Sights ==
- The church of St. Fiacre, dating from the 15th century
- The château de Billeron, 18th century

== See also ==
- Communes of the Cher department
