= Rita Arnould =

German housekeeper (1914–1943)

- Born: 11 September 1914; Frankfurt
- Died: 20 August 1943 (aged 28); Plötzensee Prison, Berlin, Germany
- Occupation: Housekeeper

Rita Arnould (c. 1914 – 20 August 1943) was a housekeeper and courier of the Red Orchestra resistance group in Belgium during World War II. She was captured when the Funkabwehr raided an apartment at 101 Rue des Atrébates in Brussels on 12 December 1941 at 2 pm, from which a Soviet clandestine radio station was being run.

== Early years ==
Arnould was born in Frankfurt am Main to a Jewish family. She studied philosophy at Frankfurt am Main University, where she became the companion of Isidor Springer. He convinced her to become a Communist activist. In 1933 the couple moved to Brussels (Note: Another source says Rita fled to Belgium from Düsseldorf.) after Hitler had seized power since it was now dangerous in Germany to be either a Jew or Communist. Soon after reaching Brussels, she married A. M. Arnould, a well-to-do Dutch textile salesman who was over twice her age, and settled into a domestic routine.

During World War II (1939–45) the Germans invaded Belgium in May 1940. Rita's husband died soon after, leaving her with no money. She asked Isidor Springer to help. He was now making a good living selling diamonds and had a Belgian wife. Springer established her as his mistress at 101 Rue des Atrébates, where she worked as a housekeeper and courier for two Soviet agents who called themselves Mikhail Makarov whose code name was "Carlos Ala mo"and Zofia Poznańska who operated under the false Belgian identity of "Anna Verlinden".

== Capture ==
The Germans detected radio transmissions from the house and a group led by Abwehr Captain Harry Piepe raided it in the small hours of the night of 12–13 December 1941. A man burst from the house but was caught and brought back. Inside the house, they found Rita, a woman agent, and a radio transmitter that was still warm. The woman was trying to burn enciphered messages, which the Germans recovered. The man was a radio operator named Anton Danilov, probably an alias of David Kamy. The Germans found a hidden room holding the material and equipment needed to produce forged documents, including blank passports, forms, inks, and rubber stamps. Rita was terrified and told Captain Piepe what she knew. There were two passports with pictures that Rita identified as the head of all the Soviet espionage groups in Europe and his deputy in Belgium. The next day Mikhail Makarov, who had been using the alias Carlos Alamo and was also a radio operator, came to the house and was also arrested.

== Aftermath ==
Rita was 27 years old when she was arrested. Her information led to the discovery of others in the network and the collapse of the Rote Kapelle (Red Orchestra) network. (Note: The term "Red Orchestra" was coined by the Reich Security Main Office (RSHA), the security service and counter-espionage arm of the SS, which referred to resistance radio operators as "pianists", their transmitters as "pianos", and their supervisors as "conductors".) During later interrogations Rita gave information that led to the German discovery of the Soviet agents' cypher The Germans had omitted to take the books that were lying on the table, and a member of the spy network later removed them. When the Germans realized that the cypher was a book code, they coached Rita to remember the titles. With difficulty, she recalled the title Le Miracle du Professeur Wolmar, an obscure 1910 novel. This turned out to be the key. The book was not located until May 1942, when a copy was found in an antiquarian bookshop in Paris. Using it, about 120 intercepted messages from June 1941 onward were deciphered, including a message with the addresses of key Soviet agents in Berlin.

Springer managed to avoid arrest and moved to Lyon in France, where he resumed his clandestine work. The head of the ring, Victor Guryevitch, also escaped. The woman taken with Rita was a Polish Jew named Zofia Poznańska (Zosia) who had been trained in cyphering in Moscow before the war. She refused to collaborate and killed herself in St. Gilles Prison in Brussels on 29 September 1942. Makarov was tried before the Kriegsgerichtshof (the army's military court), sentenced to death, and executed in 1942 at Plötzensee Prison in Berlin. David Kamy was tried by a German military court in Belgium, sentenced to death, and executed at Fort Breendonk on 30 April 1943. Arnould was taken to Berlin-Moabit prison. She was tried by the Berlin Kriegsgerichtshof in April 1943, sentenced to death, and executed on 20 August 1943 at Plötzensee Prison (Note: There are varied accounts of the end of Rita's life. One book says that she and Mikhail Makarov were taken to Gestapo HQ for interrogation. She heard Makarov being tortured, agreed to tell everything she knew, but was executed a few weeks later. Another book says she was taken to a small hotel (again by the Gestapo), placed in a comfortable room under guard, and treated kindly while she was questioned. After some weeks, when they thought she had no more to say, she was raped by a group of Gestapo agents, then dragged naked to the rear courtyard and decapitated.)

== Sources ==
- Brysac, Shareen Blair (2002), Resisting Hitler: Mildred Harnack and the Red Orchestra, Oxford University Press, ISBN 978-0-19-992388-5
- Crowdy, Terry (2011), The Enemy Within: A History of Spies, Spymasters and Espionage, Bloomsbury Publishing, ISBN 978-1-78096-243-6
- Höhne, Heinz (10 June 1968), "ptx ruft moskau", Der Spiegel (in German), archived from the original on April 4, 2016
- Nash, Jay Robert (1997), Spies: A Narrative Encyclopedia of Dirty Tricks and Double Dealing from Biblical Times to Today, M. Evans, ISBN 978-1-4617-4770-3
- Rau, Peter (21 December 2012), "Ein legendäres Orchester", Die Linke (in German), archived from the original on 2018-07-19
- Richelson, Jeffrey (1995), A Century of Spies: Intelligence in the Twentieth Century, Oxford University Press US, ISBN 0-19-511390-X
- Tarrant, V.E. (1995), The Red Orchestra, John Wiley & Sons, ISBN 0-471-13439-2
- Tyas, Stephen (2017), SS-Major Horst Kopkow: From the Gestapo to British Intelligence, Fonthill Media, GGKEY:JT39J4WQW30
- West, Nigel (2007), Historical Dictionary of World War II Intelligence, Scarecrow Press, ISBN 978-0-8108-6421-4
