= Léon Grossvogel =

Polish organiser of the Red Orchestra

- Born: 27 November 1904; Łódź, Poland
- Died: 1944-1945
- Occupation(s): Communist agitator, later businessman
- Years active: 1923-1944 or 1945 (sources vary)
- Organization: Comintern official
- Known for: Soviet Red Orchestra ("Rote Kapelle") in Belgium and France

Leon Grossvogel (born 27 November 1904 in Łódź; likely died 1944-1945) was a Polish-French Jewish businessman, Comintern official, resistance fighter, communist agitator and one of the organizers of a Soviet intelligence network in Belgium and France, that was later called the Red Orchestra ("Rote Kapelle") by the Abwehr. Grossvogel used the following code names to disguise his identity: Pieper, Grosser, and Andre. In the autumn of 1938, Grossvogel became associated with Leopold Trepper, a Soviet intelligence agent who would later run a large espionage network in Europe. Grossvogel established two cover companies, the Foreign Excellent Raincoat Company and later Simexco that would be used by Trepper as a cover and funding for his espionage network. Grossvogel who organised funding for the companies, would later become an assistant to Trepper, organising safehouses, couriers, cutouts and agents.

== Life ==
His father was Osias Grossvogel, who was a Jewish religious scholar. In 1926, Grossvogel and his sister, moved to Belgium via Strasbourg, initially staying in Ghent. In 1929, he became a member of the Belgian Communist Party.

In May 1938, Grossvogel married Jeanne Fernande Pesant at Holborn Registry Office in London. Jeanne Grossvogel ran the Ostend branch of Le Roi du Caoutchouc. The couple gave birth to a daughter, Nicole Germaine Grossvogel, in October 1942.

== Work ==
Grossvogel ran a small Brussels business called Le Roi du Caoutchouc or The Raincoat King on behalf of its owners. His sister Sarah Kapolowitz was married to one of the directors, his brother-in-law Louis Kapolowitz. He had been employed by the firm as an employee since 1929 and became the manager of its foreign subsidiary The Excellent Raincoat Company in 1935. In 1937, his job position changed when he became the travelling inspector for the company. Although Grossvogel was related to one of the owners by marriage and who recognised him as a good worker, he had become unpopular with his employees due to his communist sympathies and his errant behaviour during a strike at their Brussels plant in 1938.

== Foreign Excellent Raincoat Company ==
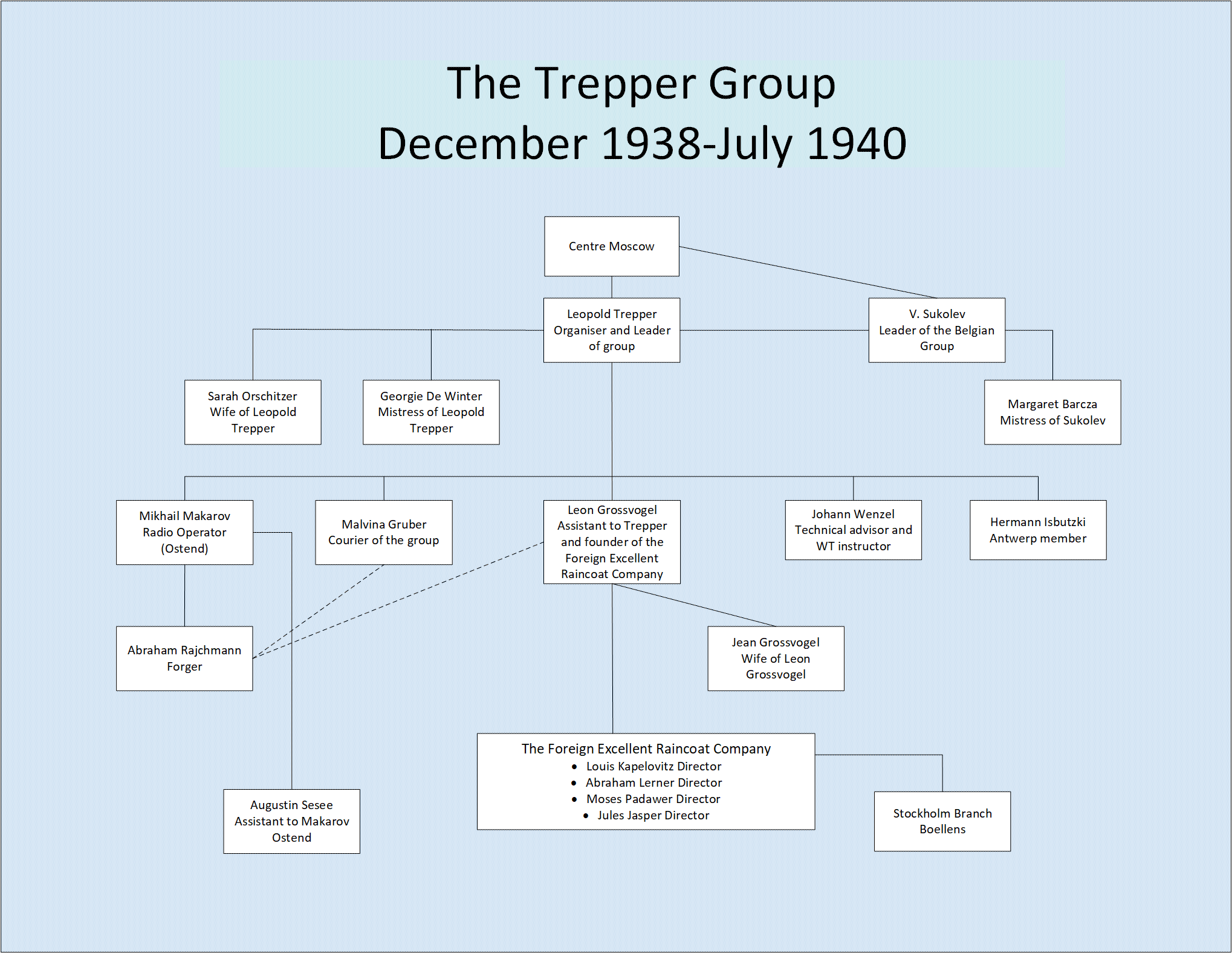
Grossvogel played a central role in the Red Orchestra espionage network in Belgium and France

In the autumn of 1938, Polish Communist and agent of the Red Army Intelligence agent, Leopold Trepper made contact with Grossvogel, whom he had known while he was in Palestine in the 1920s. He travelled under the alias Adam Mikler, a wealthy Canadian businessman, and had a plan to create a business that would be the export division of The Raincoat King and agreed with Grossvogel the plan to create a new business, without telling Grossvogel of his own intelligence mission It would be the ideal cover for espionage network. Trepper financed Grossvogel to the sum of $8,000 to create the new business, that was given an unidiomatic name of Foreign Excellent Raincoat Company.

In December 1938, Grossvogel formed the new company, that would export raincoats. Grossvogel became manager of the new firm. As a representative of the company, he made trips to Norway, Switzerland, Denmark, and Finland, in the spring and summer of 1939, i.e. the places Trepper planned to establish bases for operations against the United Kingdom.

In March 1939, Under a plan created by Trepper, Grossvogel arranged for Red Army Intelligence agent Mikhail Makarov to become manager of a branch of the raincoat company in Ostend, replacing Grossvogel's wife. Makarov planned to put a transmitter in the city, to establish communication with agent in England.

After the start of World War II, Trepper abandoned the idea of trying to expand the raincoat company overseas, stopping intelligence activities against Britain. In July 1940, he decided to move to Paris, France to avoid capture by the advancing German front and Grossvogel went with him.

== Simex ==
In the autumn of 1940, Grossvogel efforts led to the establishment of the Simex firm in Paris firm, becoming its managing director. The companies name was a metonym for S for Societe, IM for Import, EX for Export and was established as a large company, offering military engineering contract services for Nazi German contracts resulting from the occupation. Grossvogel's task was to grow the business, while Trepper used the business to mask his clandestine activities unnoticed. In 1941, French commercial director Alfred Corbin became managing director of Simex leaving Grossvogel acting in the role of assistant, carrying out Trepper's instructions as he met with businessmen and industrialists.

As the year changed into 1942, Grossvogel's role changed as he became Trepper main assistant, becoming more involved in the daily operation of the espionage network. One of his main tasks was the establishment of a reliable communications line and the supervision of agents who uses it. Grossvogel would also train radio operators.

=== Payments ===
Grossvogel was paid a retainer by Russian intelligence, at 175 dollars per months. After the start of the war, this was increased to 225 dollars per month.

== Arrest ==
On the 30 November 1942, Grossvogel was arrested, while waiting for a rendezvous with the forger and criminal, Abraham Rajchmann, at the Café de la Paix in Paris, He was betrayed by Trepper. He was imprisoned in Fresnes Prison and tortured by the Gestapo, as they had been told by captured Soviet agent, Anatoly Gurevich, that he knew the code that was used to encrypt communications between the espionage group and Soviet intelligence. However, he refused to divulge the secret.

It is unknown whether Grossvogel was executed as other members of the Red Orchestra were, or that he survived the war (sources vary). It was likely he was still alive during the allied invasion however it is equally likely he was secretly tried and convicted by a Luftwaffe court and then executed, either in Fresnes prison, or more likely taken to Germany in 1944 or 1945. His wife, Jeanne Grossvogel, was arrested by the Gestapo in Brussels on 25 November 1942 and executed in Plötzensee prison on 6 July 1943.

== Awards and honours ==
The Center of Contemporary Jewish Documentation has a document that attest that Grossvogel was awarded diplomas for acts of resistance during the war. These were

- 1945 Croix de Guerre 1940 with palm
- 1945 Knight's Cross of the Order of Leopold II with palm
- 1949 Cross of the Order of the Resistance 1940-1944
- 1957 Commemorative War Medal 1940-1945
- 1957 Medal of Resistance
