= Enclosure of the executed =

Cemetery in Brussels, Belgium

- Enclos des fusillés (French); Erepark der gefusilleerden (Dutch)
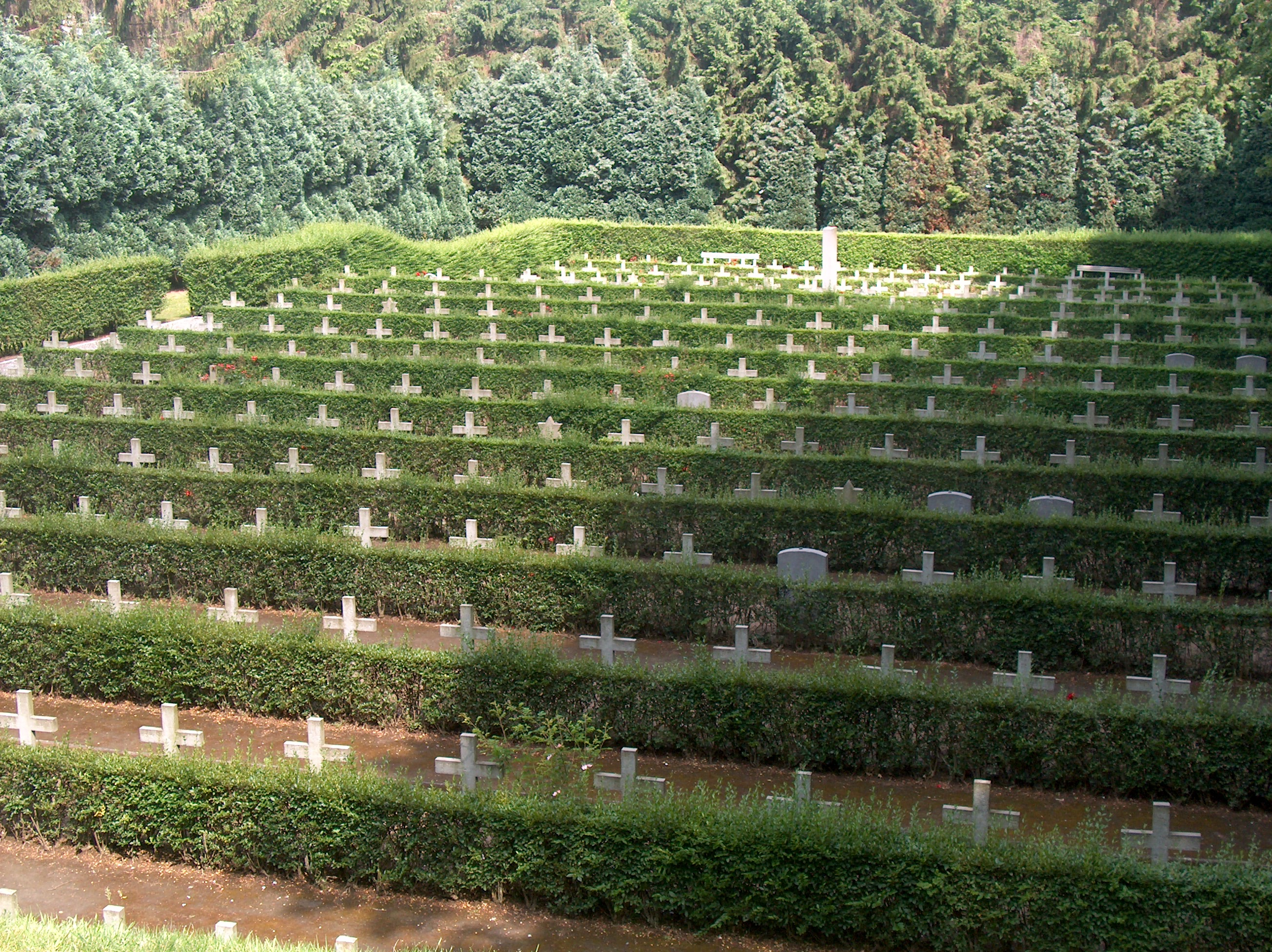
- Overview of the cemetery
- Interactive map of Enclosure of the executed

Details
- Location: Rue Colonel Bourg / Kolonel Bourgstraat 102; Schaerbeek, Brussels-Capital Region
- Country: Belgium
- Coordinates: 50°51′10.9″N 4°24′23.6″E
- No. of graves: 365

The Enclosure of the executed (French: Enclos des fusillés; Dutch: Erepark der gefusilleerden) is a small cemetery in the Brussels municipality of Schaerbeek, where 365 resistance fighters of both world wars are buried.

The field of honour is located at 102, rue Colonel Bourg/Kolonel Bourgstraat, where the National Shooting Range was previously located. Nowadays, it lies on the plot of several media networks, including the Flemish Radio and Television Broadcasting Organisation and the Belgian Radio and television of the French Community.

== History ==
During the First World War, the shooting range was seized by the German forces who executed thirty-five people there, including Jozef Baeckelmans, Philippe Baucq, Louis Bril, Edith Cavell, and Gabrielle Petit.

During the Second World War, another 261 people were executed by German soldiers, including Youra Livchitz, known for stopping a Holocaust train, saving dozens of Jews transported to Auschwitz concentration camp. After the war, the turf where they were buried was transformed into a memorial site.

Thirty-eight graves are of unknown individuals. A memorial commemorates the thirty-five executed individuals during the First World War. In 1970, another monument was erected, honouring the unknown Belgian political prisoners of the Second World War. It consists of a high burial column and an urn containing relics of victims of the concentration camps.

The burial site has been part of the protected immovable heritage of Schaerbeek since 12 January 1983.

== Commemoration ==
Every last Sunday of April, an official ceremony is organised honouring the prisoners of the concentration camps of the Second World War, in the presence of the highest dignitaries of Belgium.

The Université libre de Bruxelles (ULB) and the Vrije Universiteit Brussel (VUB) hold an annual commemoration in the cemetery during their Saint Verhaegen holiday on 20 November (or the Friday before if 20 November falls on a weekend).

== Buried or commemorated ==
- Joseph Baeckelmans (1881–1915), architect of several mansions of the Antwerp Zurenborg area, drafted reports regarding train traffic as a resistance member. Together with his friend Alexander Franck, he was the first one to be executed at the shooting range.
- Philippe Baucq (1880–1915), architect and member of the network of Edith Cavell which helped wounded allied soldiers escape to the neutral Netherlands. Executed at the same time as Cavell, in order to quell the international protest.
- Arthur Hellmann (1906–1944), tailor who was involved in the resistance movement during the Second World War. As a Jew himself, he participated in an attack against a transport of Jews, and organised an armed attack at the hospital of Tienen, which resulted in the escape of a few resistance fighters. Arrested on 2 June 1943, incarcerated in Mechelen prison, then Breendonk prison camp, where he was executed.
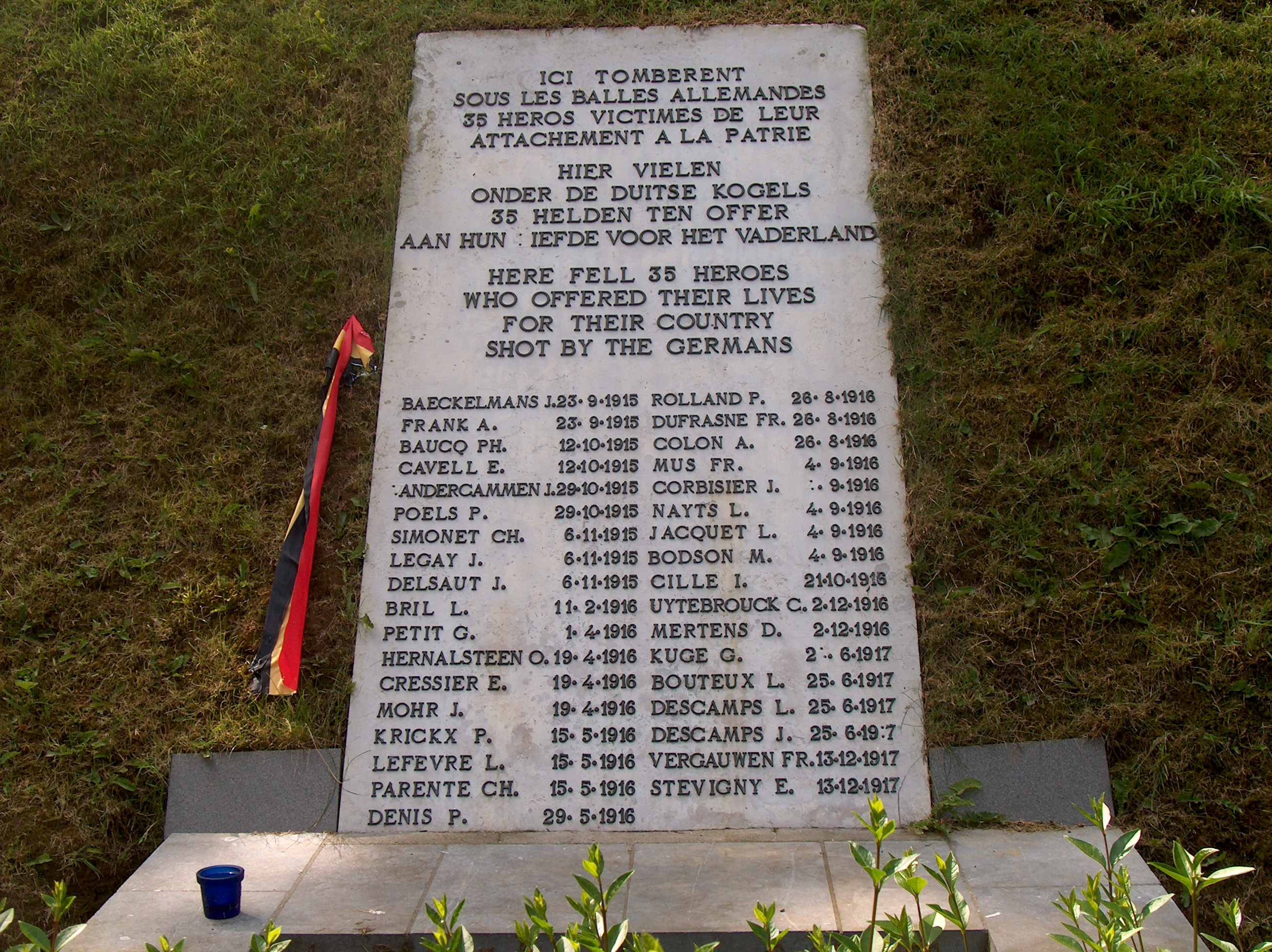
Memorial for thirty-five individuals of the First World War, including Edith Cavell and Gabrielle Petit

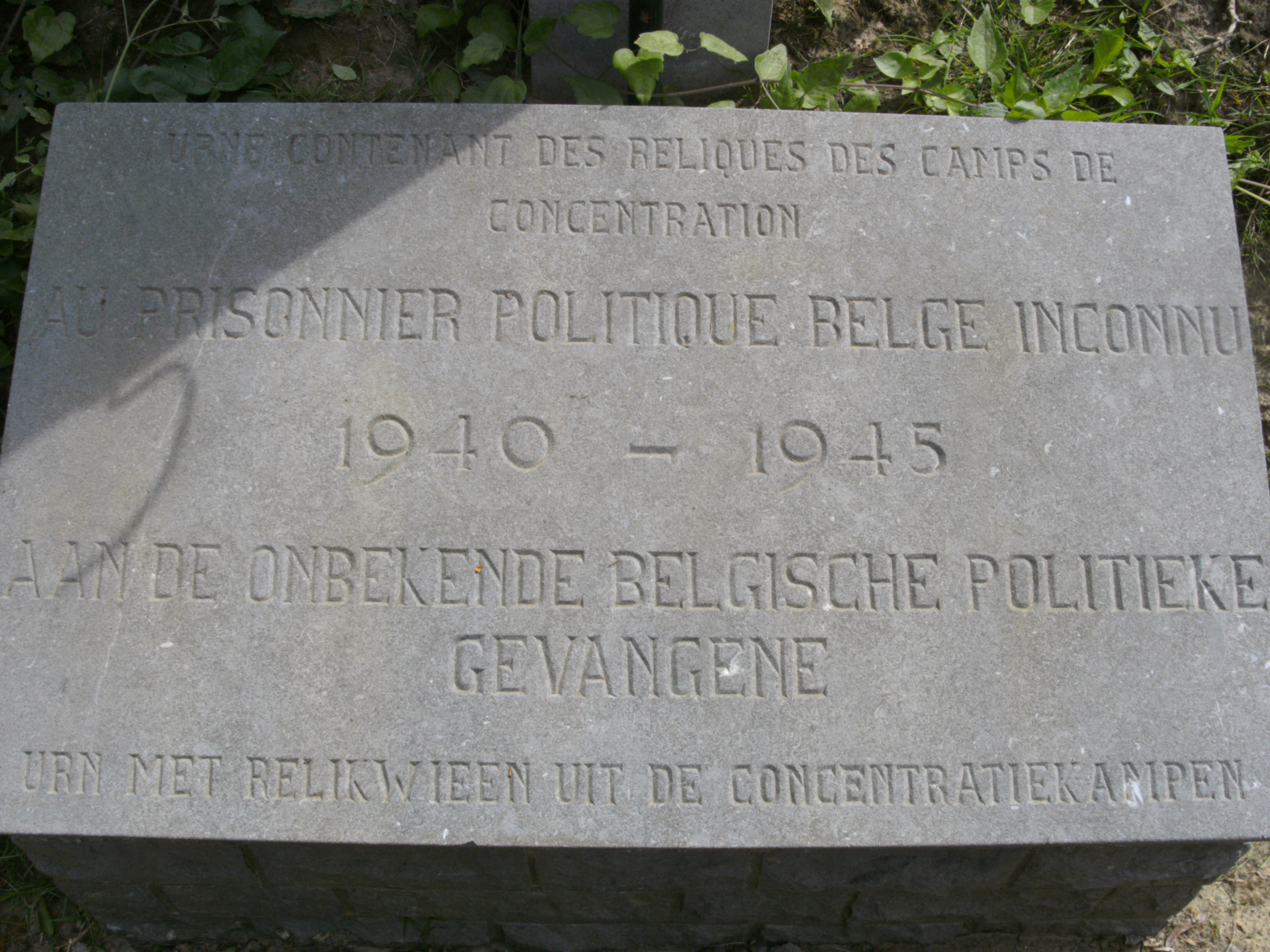
Urn containing the relics of political prisoners of the Second World War

== See also ==
- History of Brussels
- List of inmates of Saint-Gilles Prison
