= Saint Verhaegen =

Student holiday in Brussels, Belgium

Saint Verhaegen: Saint-Verhaegen (French); Sint-Verhaegen (Dutch)
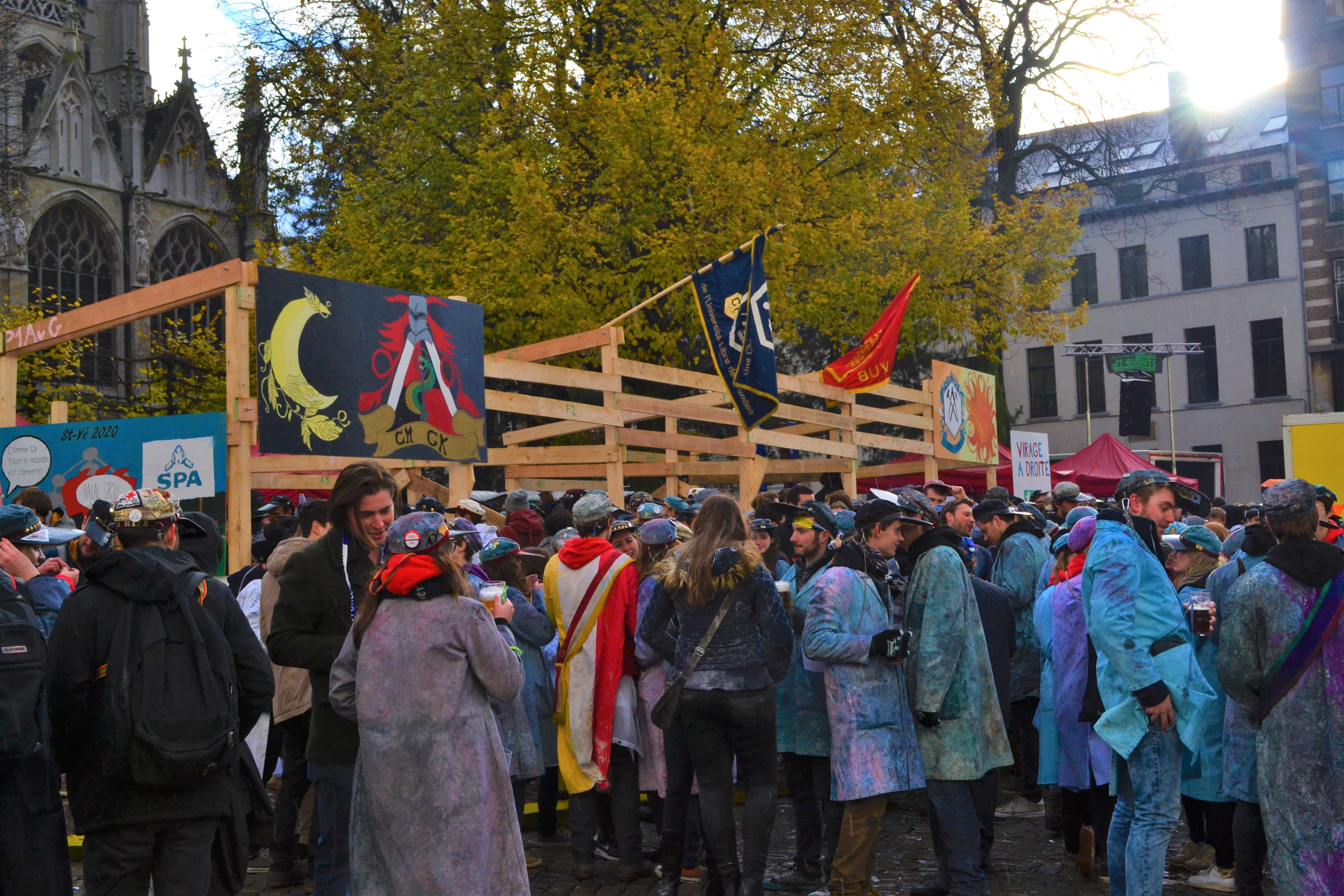
- Saint Verhaegen festivities in Brussels
- Nickname: St V
- Status: Active
- Date: 20 November
- Frequency: Annual
- Venue: Sablon/Zavel (main); Pentagon (various)
- Locations: City of Brussels, Brussels-Capital Region
- Coordinates: 50°50′27″N 4°21′18″E
- Country: Belgium
- Inaugurated: 24 November 1888
- Founder: Free University of Brussels
- Most recent: 20 November 2026
- Next event: 20 November 2027

Saint Verhaegen (French: Saint-Verhaegen; Dutch: Sint-Verhaegen), commonly shortened to Saint-V (in French), Sint-V (in Dutch), or St V, is an annual student celebration held on 20 November in Brussels, Belgium, to mark the founding of the Free University of Brussels in 1834. The name is a reference to Pierre-Théodore Verhaegen, the university's founder, who ironically is not a saint and promoted free inquiry; it was chosen in parody of Saint Nicholas festivities at the rival Catholic University, reflecting the event's freethinking and humanist spirit.

First held in 1888 as a protest against the then-academic authorities, Saint Verhaegen has grown into a central element of Brussels' student folklore, combining an official commemoration and a large parade through the city. Organised by the French- and Dutch-speaking Brussels Student Associations, it brings together students, alumni, staff and professors from the Université libre de Bruxelles (ULB) and the Vrije Universiteit Brussel (VUB). A festive tribute to freedom of thought and expression and a platform for social critique, the festivities also include side activities organised by student societies and attract thousands of participants.

Since 1931, a different theme (illustrated with a medal) has been chosen for each edition, usually responding to current events and taking a liberal/anti-clerical approach. Since 2019, Saint Verhaegen has also been listed as intangible cultural heritage of the Brussels-Capital Region.

== History ==
=== Origins of Saint Verhaegen ===
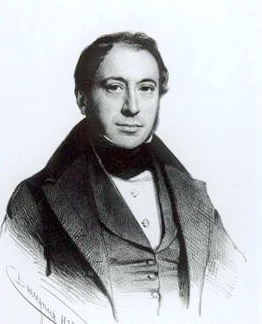
Pierre-Théodore Verhaegen, founder of the Free University of Brussels

The first academic year of the Free University of Brussels began on 20 November 1834, a date that was initially celebrated with a day off from classes. In 1843, the Union des Anciens Etudiants (UAE) alumni association was founded, and from 1859, it organised annual gatherings on 20 November in Brussels' bars, featuring a spectacular punch followed by a banquet. The punch soon became a recurring element in festive university occasions.

On 20 November 1888, amid tensions with professors and administrators, students decided to openly honour their founder, Pierre-Théodore Verhaegen, for establishing free inquiry (French: libre examen, Dutch: vrij onderzoek). That morning, 200 of the university's 1,400 students, many of them freemasons (as Verhaegen was also the founder of the Grand Orient of Belgium), assembled at Verhaegen's statue, and dressed in formal attire, marched in procession to his tomb in Brussels Cemetery to lay flowers. The press ironically described the gesture as a "canonisation", a term the students quickly embraced, giving birth to Saint Verhaegen and embedding a critical, satirical element into the tradition. Two years later, academic authorities joined the commemoration for the first time.

=== Evolution of the event ===
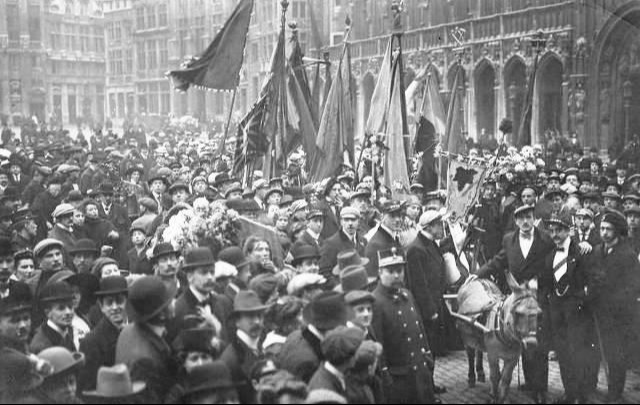
Saint Verhaegen at the Grand-Place/Grote Markt in the early 20th century

In following years, the event evolved into a long procession along the Boulevard Anspach/Anspachlaan (Brussels' main boulevard), in which students marched with much fanfare, waving the flags of their respective organisations. From 1911, students also paid tribute to the statue of the Spanish education reformer Francisco Ferrer, a symbol of free thought, intellectual freedom, and rationalist education. The festive aspect initially began only in the late afternoon, but after the university relocated to its Solbosch/Solbos campus in the 1920s, the day split into a morning ceremony and an afternoon parade. The Ferrer statue, removed during the First World War by the occupying forces because of its symbolic value, was relocated several times in the 1920s, ultimately being placed opposite the ULB's rectorate in 1984 to mark the university's 150th anniversary.

In 1921, the ULB presented the first student uniform to Manneken Pis, which was later stolen and replaced; over the years, various university associations, such as the Kring der Brusselse en Brabantse Studenten (KBS), have continued the tradition of dressing the statue, and they are still involved in this aspect of the celebration. By the 1930s, celebrations often extended over several days. In 1930, tributes were held on 19 November, followed by ceremonies on 20 November honouring the Unknown Soldier, Ferrer and Verhaegen, and the war dead, before concluding at dawn on 21 November with onion soup at the Moeder Lambic café.

At least since the 1930s, visiting Manneken Pis became a regular part of Saint Verhaegen, with many celebrants greeting the statue during the festivities. Some male students strongly identified with the statue as a symbol of Brussels, occasionally mimicking its pose, to the surprise of onlookers. Students usually also sang a hymn during these visits.

=== Wartime celebrations ===
The tradition continued during both world wars with adaptations. During the First World War, alumni and students not in the trenches gathered in De Panne. In 1939–1941, the parade was replaced by collections for the families of mobilised soldiers, and in 1942–43, commemorations were organised in exile in London, with additional celebrations in New York, Lisbon, and the Belgian Congo. After the university reopened in 1944, students visited the statues of Verhaegen, the Unknown Soldier, and Ferrer, concluding at the Centre for Fine Arts. The traditional parade returned in 1945, after a six-year absence.

=== Post-WWII ===
Immediately after the Second World War, flowers were placed at Frans Kufferath's grave, a student who fell in 1940 and symbolises all students who died as soldiers or Resistance members. Until the 1960s, students also visited the Tomb of the Unknown Soldier during the morning programme. Since 1963, tribute has been paid at the Enclosure of the executed (former National Shooting Range) in Schaerbeek, with a short biography of each executed student read aloud and a rose laid on their grave, accompanied by trumpet fanfare. On the Solbosch campus, flowers are placed at the monument commemorating the victims of barbarity, and since 1997, at the Groupe G monument, a Belgian Resistance group founded by former students of the university and that initially consisted largely of students.

Between the post-war period and 1969, Flemish students regularly used their speaking rights during Saint Verhaegen to demand the division of the university and the creation of a Dutch-speaking university in Brussels. These demands were eventually addressed with the division of the university into the Université libre de Bruxelles (ULB) and the Vrije Universiteit Brussel (VUB) in 1970, which gave the celebration a special significance for the Flemish student community. In 1975, the celebrations were cancelled and replaced by the students with a "mourning march" carrying a coffin to the Sablon in protest of the Humblet-De Croo law that revised higher education funding.

From the late 1980s, stricter safety regulations were introduced. Supervisors were appointed to monitor floats, alcohol restrictions were enforced, and practices such as throwing flour were banned. Measures were added to encourage responsible drinking, including stands with water and soft drinks, lower-alcohol beer, plastic cups instead of glass, mobile toilets to prevent public urination, and awareness booths where participants could test their reflexes under simulated intoxication.

In the same decade, the VUB community also paid tribute to the statue of Thyl and Nele at the Ixelles Ponds. The municipality of Ixelles had honoured the freethinking, anti-clerical author Charles De Coster fifteen years after his death with a monument representing the heroes of his book The Legend of Thyl Ulenspiegel and Lamme Goedzak. Thyl and Nele, part of the Geuzen legend, symbolise resistance against Spanish oppression, as well as the integration of Flemish and Germanic mythology into Francophone literature in Belgium.

=== 21st century ===
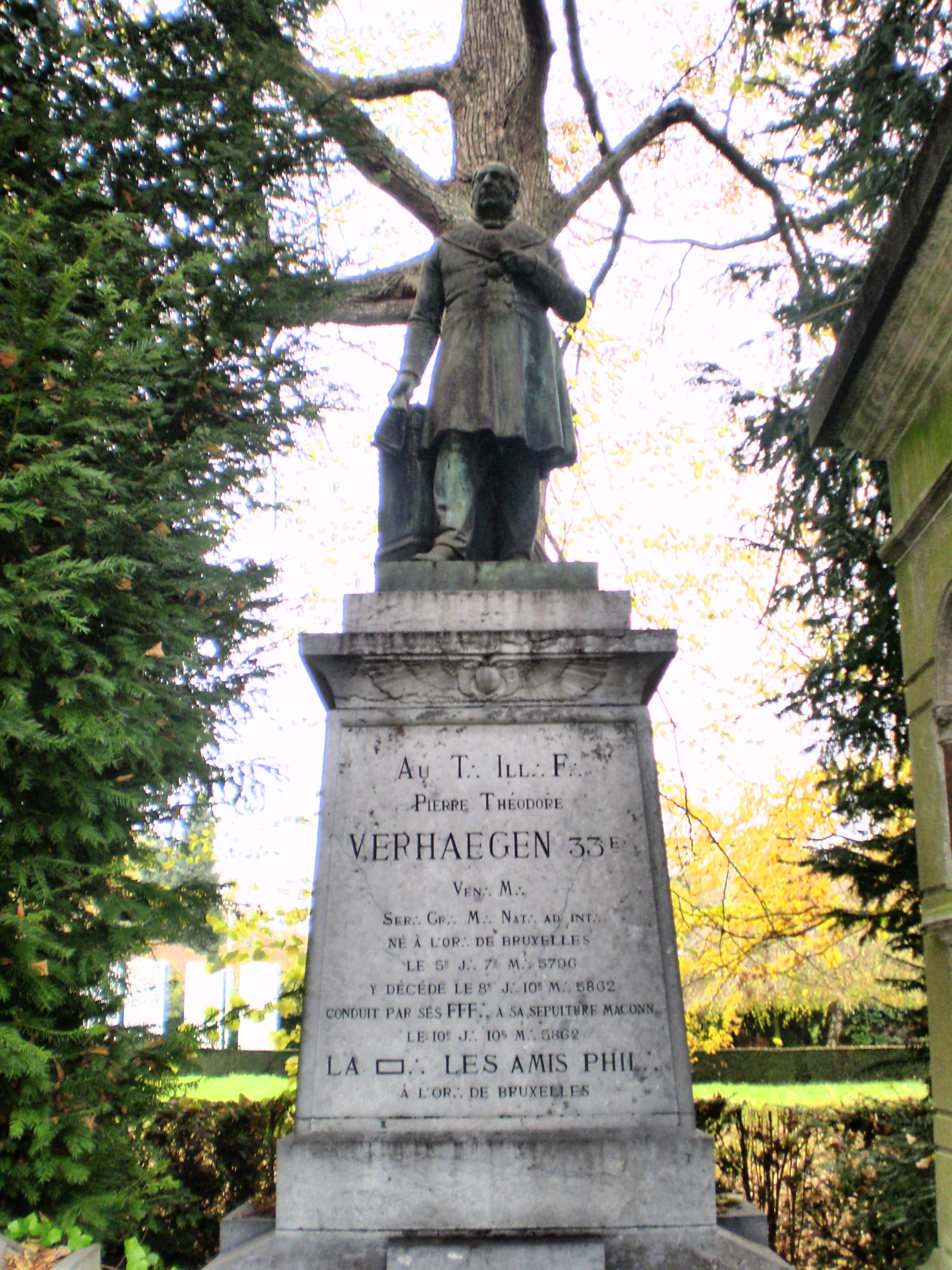
Placing flowers on Verhaegen's tomb in Brussels Cemetery by university faculty is part of the formal aspect of the celebration.

Since 2001, professors and the Brussels City Council have sought to revitalise the ceremonial aspects of the event: Manneken Pis received a renewed costume, the puppet Woltje of the Royal Theatre Toone underwent a symbolic student baptism, and an additional prize was introduced for the student float competition. The parade takes place on foot and is centred on the Square du Grand Sablon/Grote Zavelsquare, where associations set up decorated stands and banners.

Following the November 2015 Paris attacks, due to increased terror threats, the Brussels authorities cancelled the event for the first time since World War II. Many students ignored the ban, occupying the Grand Sablon and continuing the procession on foot. The following year, restrictions on transport trucks and alcohol were introduced, leading students to revive the historical practice of throwing flour, which traces back to a tradition of throwing eggs, flour, and water at the local Catholic bourgeoisie. In 2019, Saint Verhaegen was included in the inventory of intangible cultural heritage of the Brussels-Capital Region.

Due to the COVID-19 pandemic in Belgium, the 2020 festivities were held online. That year, students also selected a charitable cause: during the livestreams, VUB student associations raised funds for Villa Samson at UZ Brussel, a facility where hospitalised patients can spend time with their own pets. On 12 October 2021, it was announced that Saint Verhaegen could proceed with a Covid Safe Ticket, but on 12 November, the VUB and ULB postponed the event to 18 March 2022, due to rising COVID-19 cases, leading students to protest on 19 November, which was eventually allowed by the authorities.

== Celebrations ==
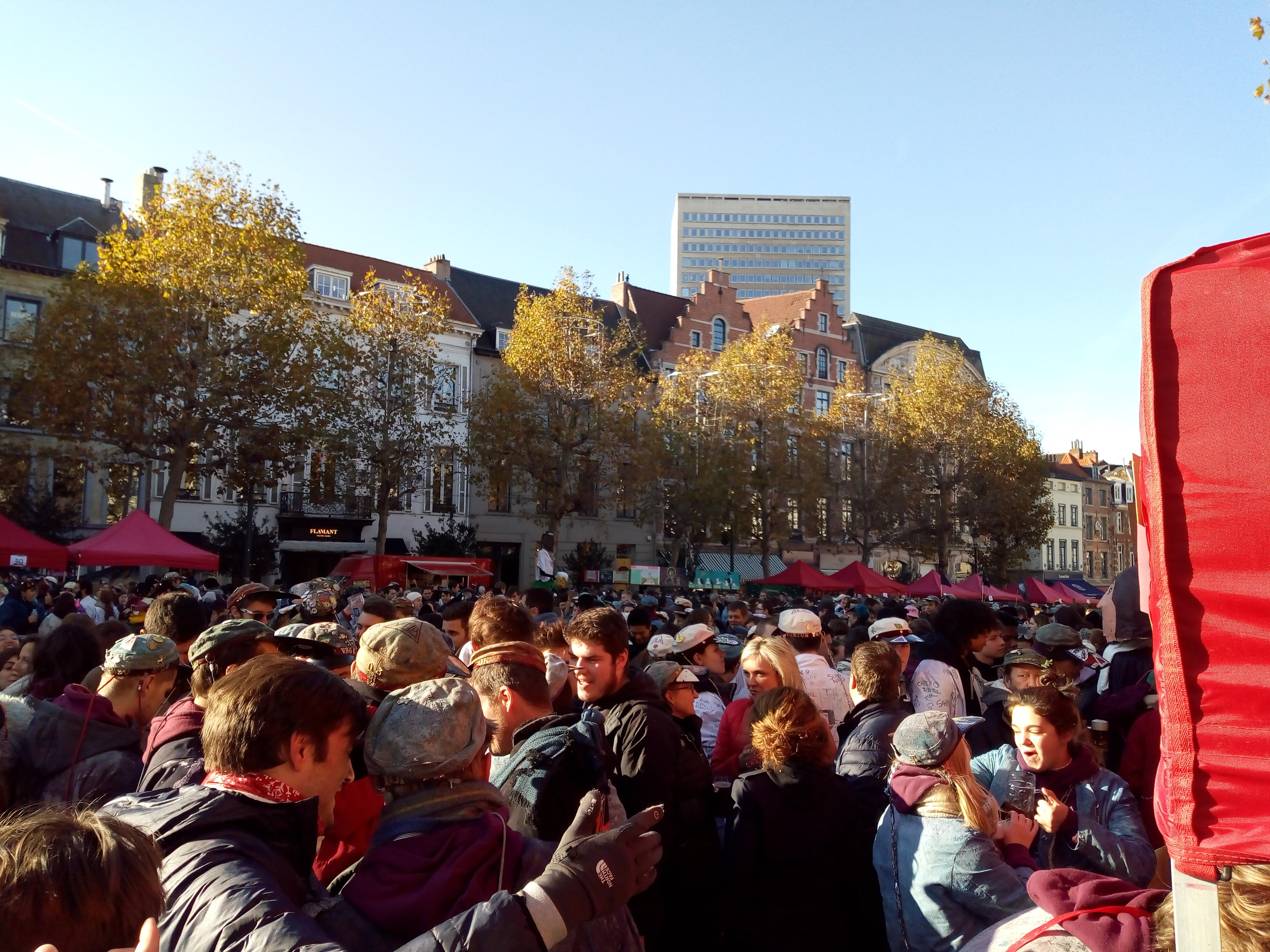
Celebrations at the Square du Grand Sablon/Grote Zavelsquare

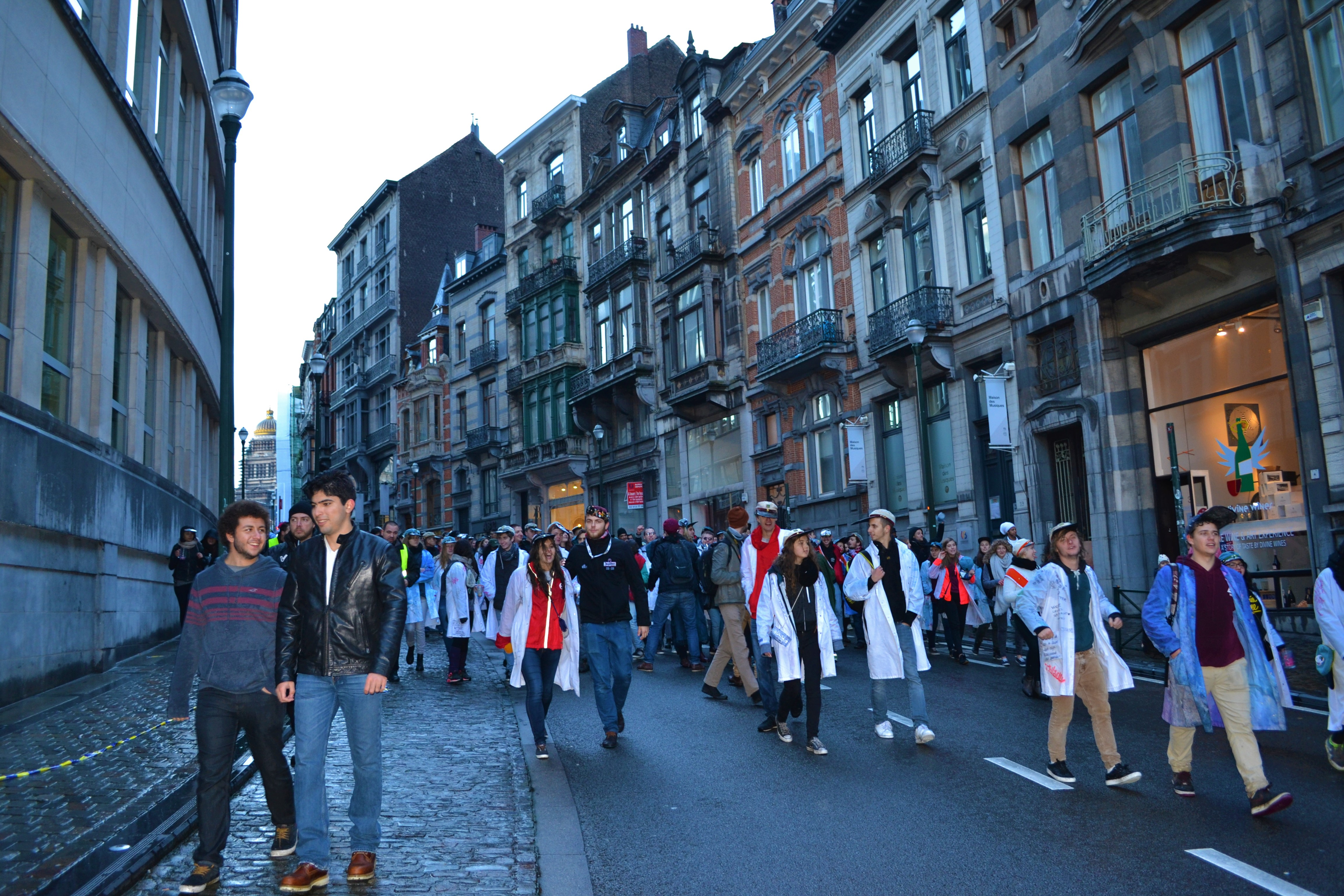
The procession descending the Rue Lebeau/Lebeaustraat

Most student groups rent a large transport truck for the occasion, which they decorate in accordance with the year's theme. Each truck has a large number of kegs inside, and some students are designated to serve beer to the others all day, with an all-you-can-drink payment scheme. Many also bring large sound systems which play loud music all day. 2013's Saint Verhaegen saw 6,000 students and 27 transport trucks take part in the procession.

The students first meet at the Square du Grand Sablon/Grote Zavelsquare in central Brussels, and after several hours, the trucks start to move towards the Bourse Palace on the Boulevard Anspach/Anspachlaan. This takes several hours as well, as the trucks move only at a walking speed and are more often than not stopped due to the students surrounding them and on the road. Beer may not be served while the trucks are in motion. All roads which the procession goes on are closed to other traffic, including the Boulevard Anspach. The students then disperse and reconvene around 9 p.m. at the ULB's Solbosch/Solbos campus, where all the year's decorations are burnt semi-ceremonially. Many alumni come to the university's discothèque on that night, which is normally only open to current students.

== Yearly themes and medals ==
Since 1931, Saint Verhaegen has been given a yearly theme, which usually critically addresses current events. These themes are generally based on the values of the universities, particularly liberalism, humanism, and anti-clericalism. However, political themes are not shunned either, with students often using Saint Verhaegen to raise awareness on social problems, ideological issues and humanitarian crises. Previous themes have included fascism, the School Struggle, state reforms, community fault lines, language politics, abortion, apartheid, human rights, freedom of speech, nationalism, migration, terrorism, climate change, poverty, the far-right, etc. In practice, the annual theme is often reflected in the decorations of the floats and the party stands on the Sablon, and is expressed on banners and signs.

Since 1938, the organisation has also issued an official medal every year, which features an often explicit illustration. Initially, this was done by the Association Générale des Etudiants (AGE); later, this task was taken on by the ACE and the BSG. A competition is usually held for the design of the medals, in which VUB and ULB students can submit their entries. Associations and individuals also regularly issue their own medals that are separate from the official theme. Given their long tradition and limited circulation, the medals have become coveted collector's items, such as in 1988, for the event's 100th anniversary.

== See also ==
- History of Brussels
- Culture of Belgium
- Ommegang of Brussels
- Meyboom
- Royal Theatre Toone
