= List of inmates of Saint-Gilles Prison =

Saint-Gilles Prison in Brussels, Belgium, has been the site of many incarcerations since its opening in 1884. During World Wars I and II, some prisoners who were held there, both civilians and captured members of the Belgian Resistance, were taken to the National Shooting Range (French: Tir national) to be executed.

== World War I ==
A–D
Joseph Baeckelmans	Philippe Baucq	Louise de Bettignies	Mathieu Bodson	Léon Boiteux
Louis Bril	Joseph Van der Cammen	Edith Cavell	Adelin Colon	Jean-Baptiste Corbisier
Paul Denis	Joseph Delsaut	Lucien Descamps	Jules Descamps	François Dufrasne
E–H
Alexandre Franck	Louis Gille	Emile Gressier	Oscar Hernalsteens
I–P
Léon Jacquet	Prosper Kricke	Georges Kuge	Louis Lefebvre	Jules Legay
Dominique Mertens	Jules Mohr	Louis Neyts	Gabrielle Petit	Pierre Poels
François Mus
Q–T
Arthur Roland	Charles Simonet	Emile Stevigny
U–Z
Georges Uytebrouck	François Vergauwen

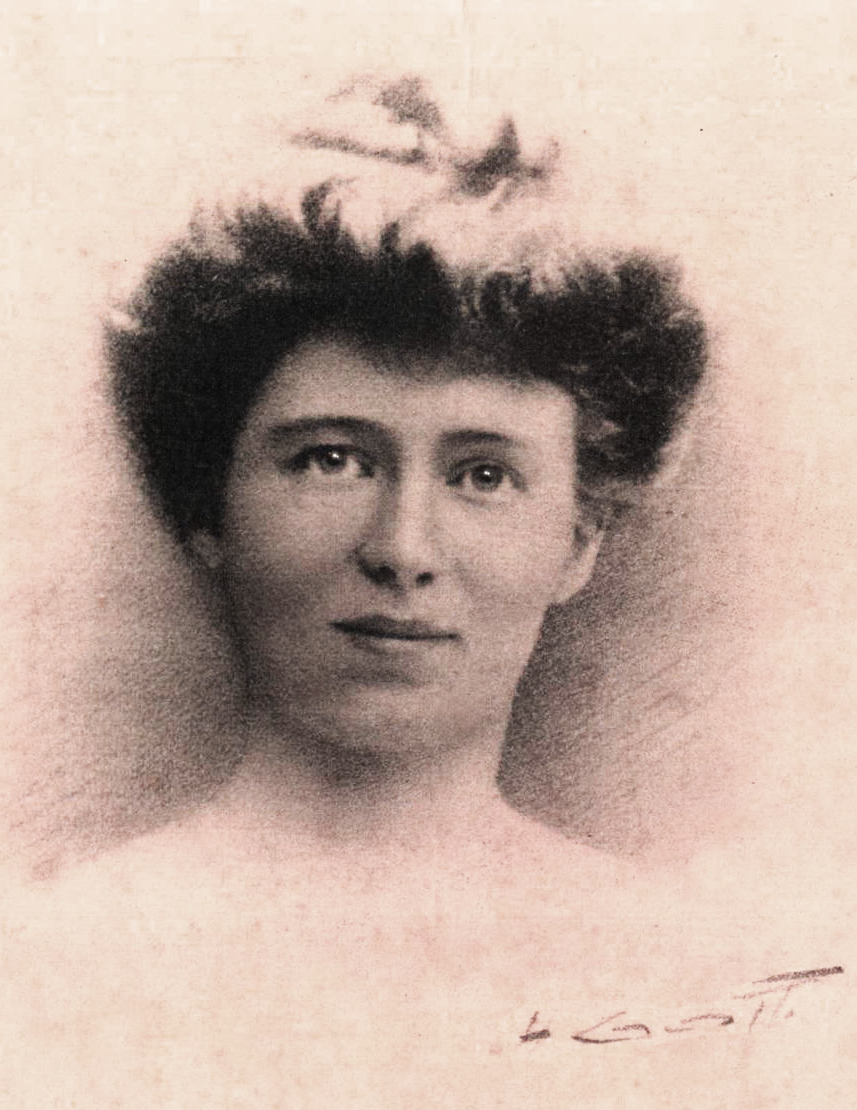
Louise de Bettignies

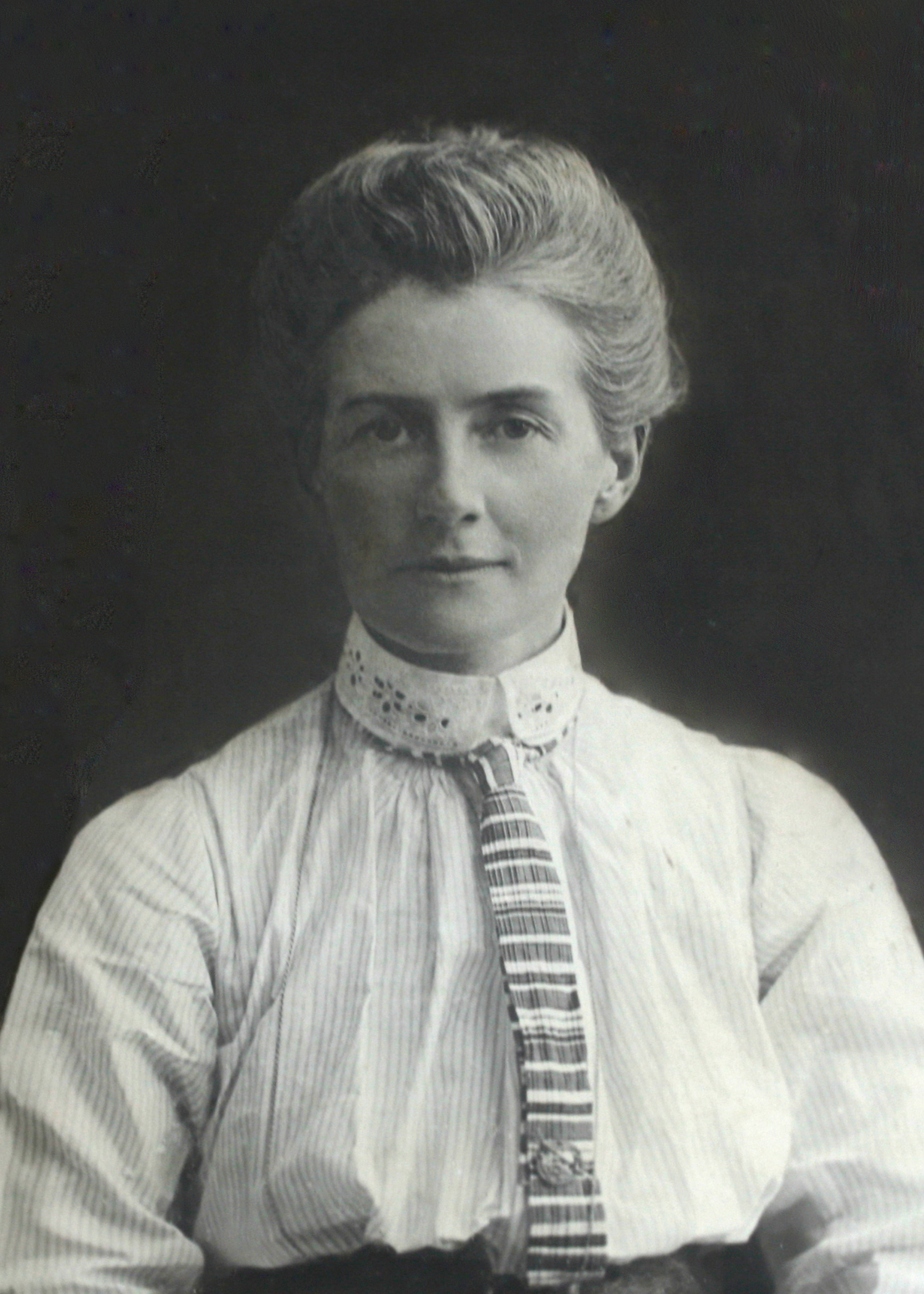
Edith Cavell

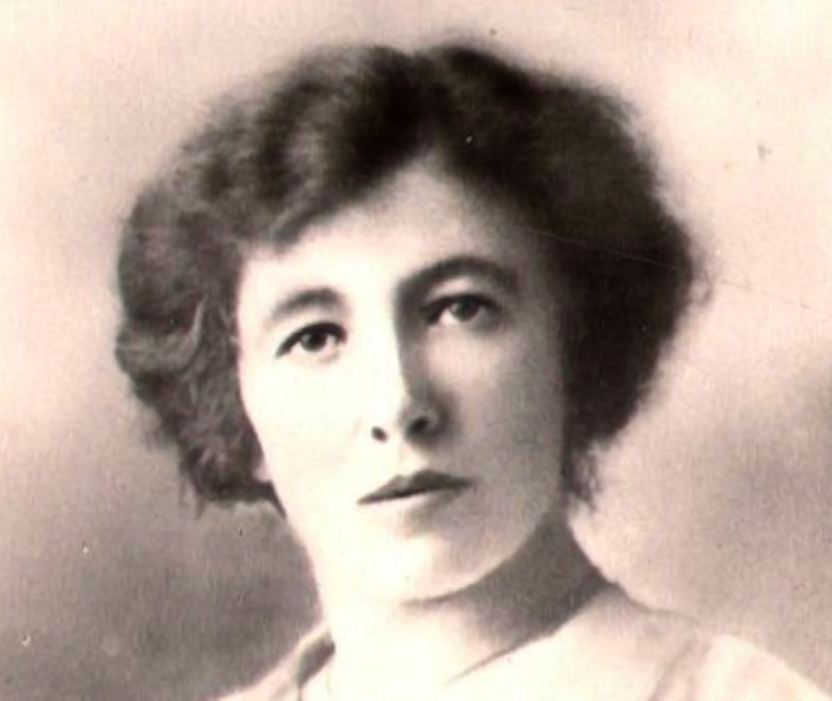
Gabrielle Petit

== World War II ==
A–D
Anne-Marie Basch	André Bertulot	Élise Binard	Jean Burgers	Marina Chafroff
Aimé Dandoy	Claire Duysburgh
E–H
Maximilien de Furstenberg	Andrée De Jongh	Louise de Landsheere	Andrée Dumon	Abraham Fogelbaum
Arnaud Fraiteur	Jean Franklemon	Walter Ganshof van der Meersch	Adelin Hartveld	Arthur Haulot
Marie-Louise Henin	Pierre-Jean Herbinger
I–P
Albert Jonnart	Maurice Kiek	Régine Krochmal	Simonne Lehouck-Gerbehaye	Robert Lentz
Alexandre Livchitz	Mikhail Makarov	Valentine Ployart	Zofia Poznańska
Q–T
Alfred Steux
U–Z
Fernande Volral	Berthe Warret	Johann Wenzel	Émile Witmeur

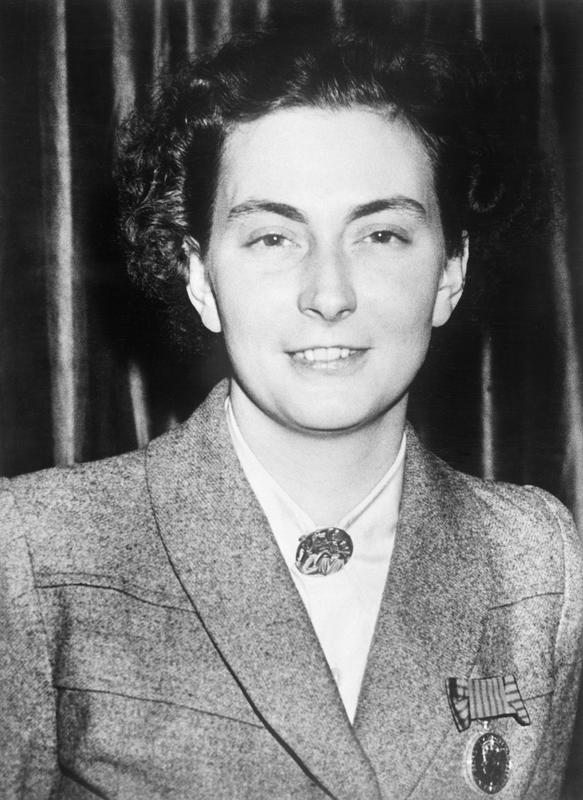
Andrée de Jongh

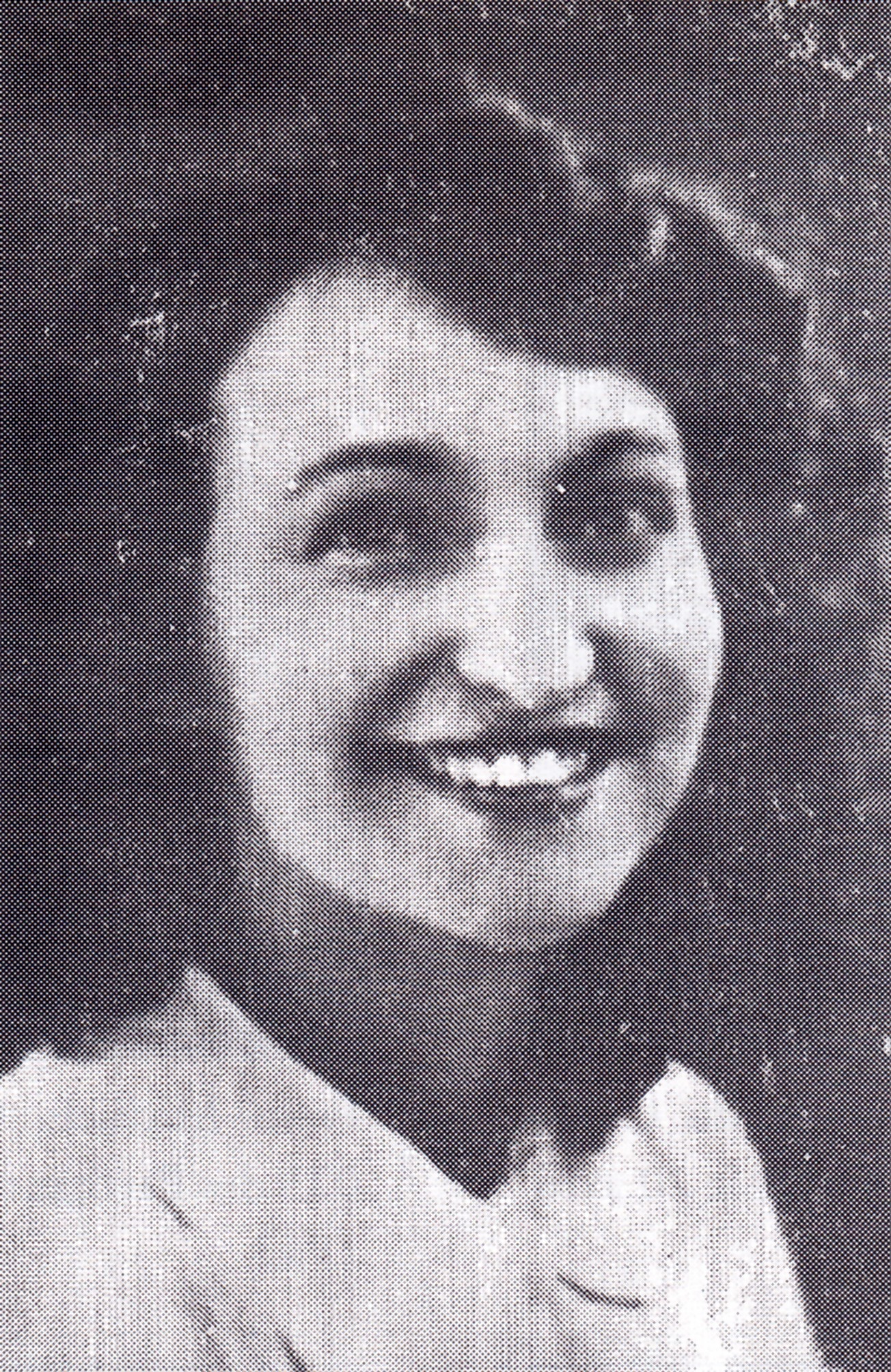
Fernande Volral

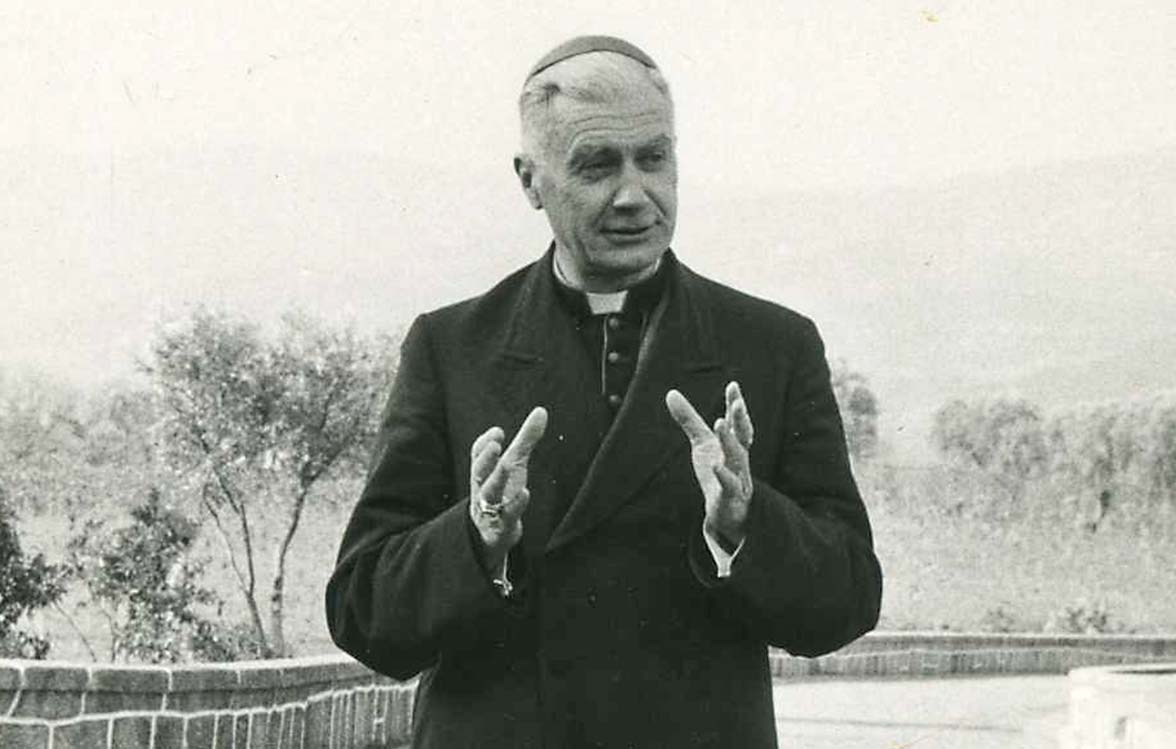
Maximilian von Fürstenberg
