= Samuel Hartveld =

Jewish Belgian art dealer whose collection was looted by the Nazis

Samuel Hartveld was a Jewish Belgian art dealer and collector based in Antwerp. His gallery and art collection were seized by the German occupation authorities during the Second World War. In the 2020s, the identification of a work from his former collection in the holdings of Tate Britain led to a major Nazi-looted art restitution case.

== Biography ==
Samuel Hartveld operated an art gallery in Antwerp, Belgium. He and his wife Clara Mailboom had a son, Adelin.

== Nazi era ==
Hartveld and his wife fled Antwerp in May 1940, following the invasion of Belgium by Nazi Germany. After their departure, the gallery was placed under Nazi-appointed Verwalter control, and on 26 March 1942 the remaining stock was seized or liquidated by the German authorities. According to research cited by the UK Spoliation Advisory Panel, the gallery’s stock included 66 paintings at the time of the German occupation all of which were liquidated by the Nazis. Hartveld survived the war, but never recovered his art collection, which had been dispersed during the occupation.

Hartveld’s son, Adelin Hartveld, remained in Belgium, joined the Resistance, and was executed by the Nazis in January 1942.

== Claims for restitution ==
One of the works in Hartveld’s possession before his flight from Belgium was the 1654 painting Aeneas and His Family Fleeing Burning Troy by Henry Gibbs. The Gibbs painting eventually entered the collection of Tate Britain, acquired in 1994 through Galerie Jan de Maere (Brussels).

In 2025, the UK Spoliation Advisory Panel issued a report concluding that the painting had been taken from Hartveld “as an act of racial persecution” and recommended its return to his heirs. The claim was submitted by the Sonia Klein Trust, acting on behalf of Hartveld’s descendants. The UK government formally accepted the recommendation, and Tate Britain agreed to restitute the painting.

On 20 November 2025 the City of Ghent announced that it would not restitute Portrait of Bishop Antonius Triest to the heirs of the late Samuel Hartveld. Hannes Hartung, the Hartveld family's legal representative, said "We dispute that Samuel Hartveld ever received any compensation for the painting and ask that the evidence of this be shared with us. Whenever an advisory committee in Europe has determined that spoliation occurred, a recommendation for restitution has followed. This is the first case in Europe where this principle has been violated in such a brazen and unfounded manner."

== See also ==
- List of claims for restitution for Nazi-looted art
- Spoliation Advisory Panel
- The Holocaust in Belgium
