= National Shooting Range =

Firing range and military training complex in Brussels, Belgium

- Tir national (French); Nationale Schietbaan (Dutch)
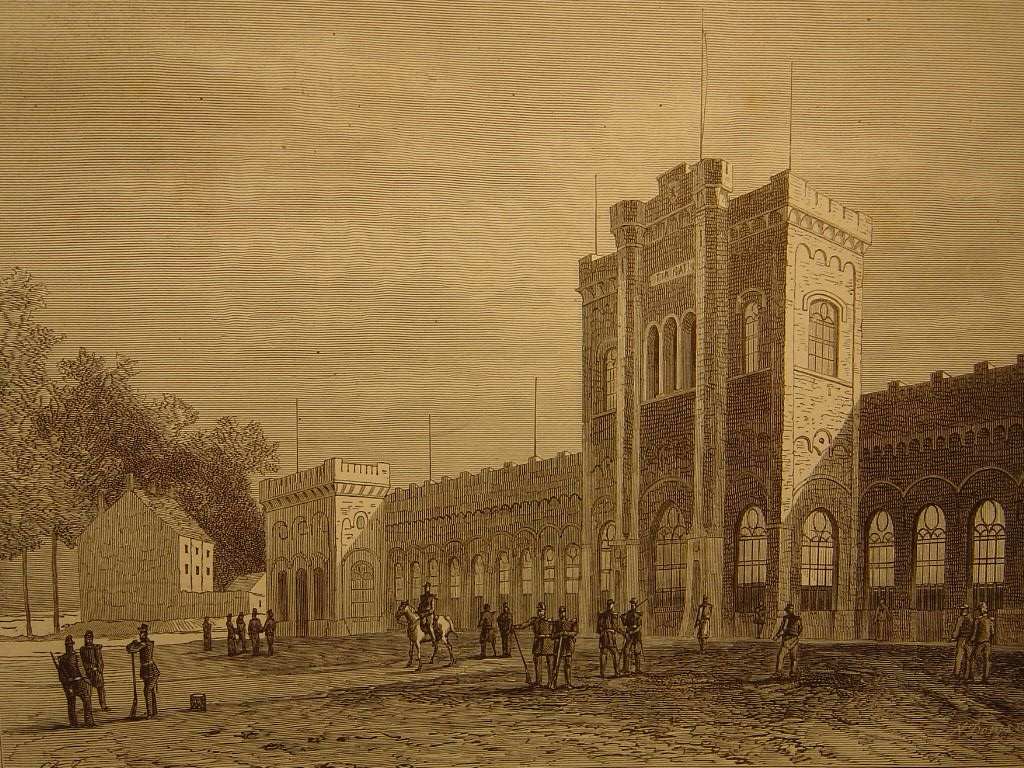
- The National Shooting Range in 1872, etching by Ch. Trumper from L'Illustration européenne
- Interactive map of the National Shooting Range area

General information
- Location: 1030 Schaerbeek, Brussels-Capital Region, Belgium
- Coordinates: 50°51′10″N 4°24′12″E
- Construction started: 1886
- Opened: 1889
- Demolished: 1963

Design and construction
- Known for: Executions

The National Shooting Range (French: Tir national; Dutch: Nationale Schietbaan) was a firing range and military training complex of 20 hectares (49 acres) situated in the municipality of Schaerbeek in Brussels, Belgium. Opened in 1889, it was intended as a place where the Garde Civique and the army could conduct shooting drills. During both world wars, the site was under the control of the occupying German forces and was used for the executions of civilians, prisoners and captured members of the Belgian Resistance. It was demolished in 1963, with the site now occupied by a media complex.

== History ==
The idea of a national shooting range dates back to the Belgian Revolution of 1830. The first range was started in 1859 by then-Prime Minister Charles Rogier, and mayor of Schaerbeek, Eugene Dailly, at the Prince Baudouin barracks on the Place Dailly/Daillyplein. This first range was abandoned in 1886 by the Belgian government due to obsolescence. Modernisation of weapons meant that longer ranges were required.

The Shooting Commission (French: Commission du Tir) decided to build a larger venue to permit military units garrisoned in Brussels and private individuals to practise over longer distances. In 1886, work was begun on a plateau at Linthout on the modern Boulevard Auguste Reyers/Auguste Reyerslaan. The centre opened in 1889. The building included a 600-metre (660 yd) indoor range which was used by members of the Garde Civique until 1920 and the army until 1945. In 1963, the centre was demolished. The site is now occupied by a media complex for the Belgian public broadcasters RTBF and VRT.

The centre had become a focus of Belgian patriotism; it was occupied and used for executions by the invading military forces of the German Empire during World War I, and again by those of Nazi Germany during World War II. In both world wars, prisoners held at Saint-Gilles Prison, both civilians and captured members of the Belgian Resistance, were taken to the National Shooting Range to be executed. Amongst those executed at the site were the English nurse Edith Cavell (on 12 October 1915) and Gabrielle Petit (on 1 April 1916). The only remaining building is dedicated to Edith Cavell. There is a small cemetery, close to the present television centre, known as the Enclosure of the executed. There are 365 tombs, and a pillar among the graves marks the location of the urn containing the remains of victims of the concentration camps in 1940–1945.

== People executed ==
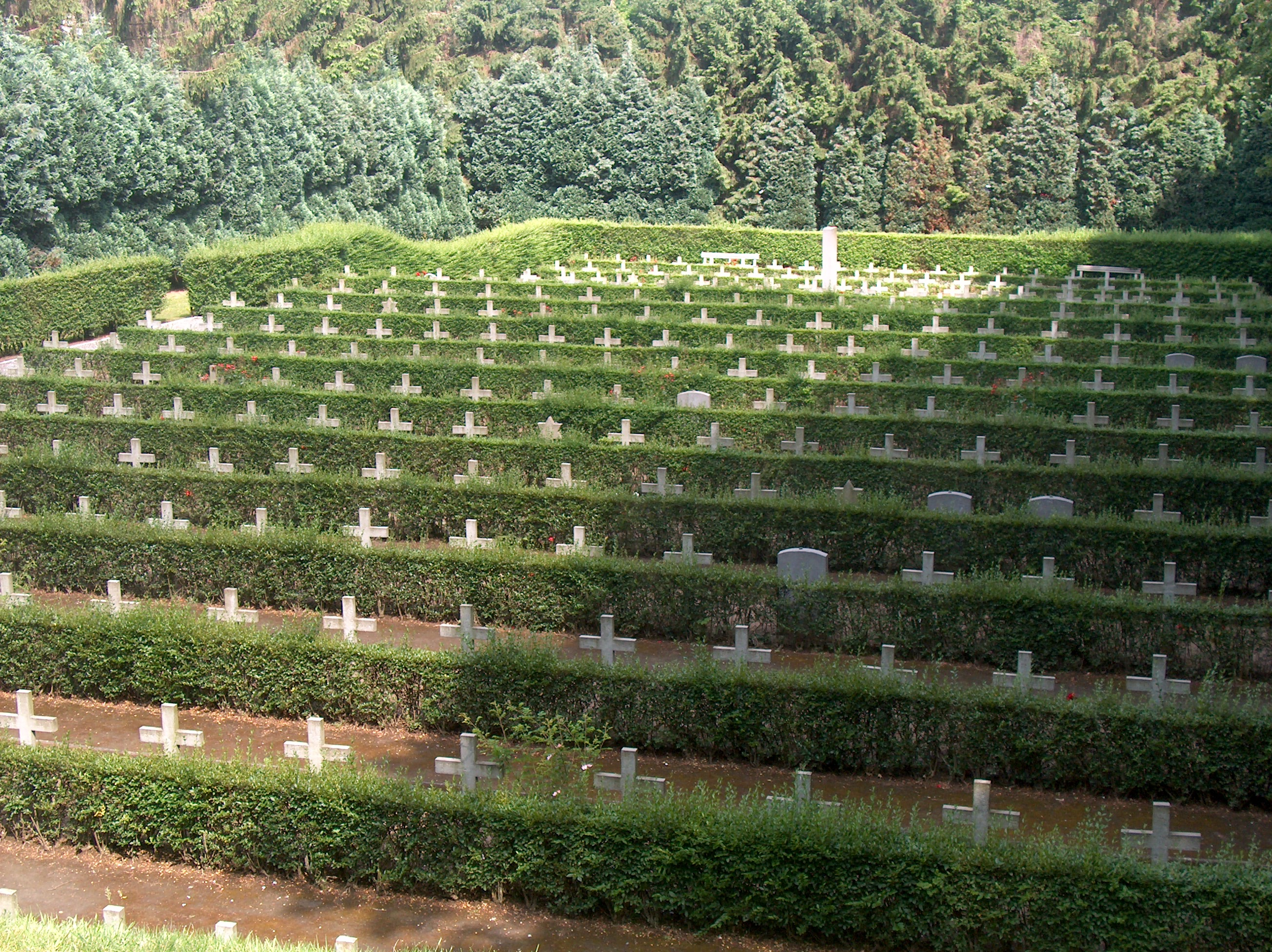
The Enclosure of the executed where the people executed at the National Shooting Range are buried

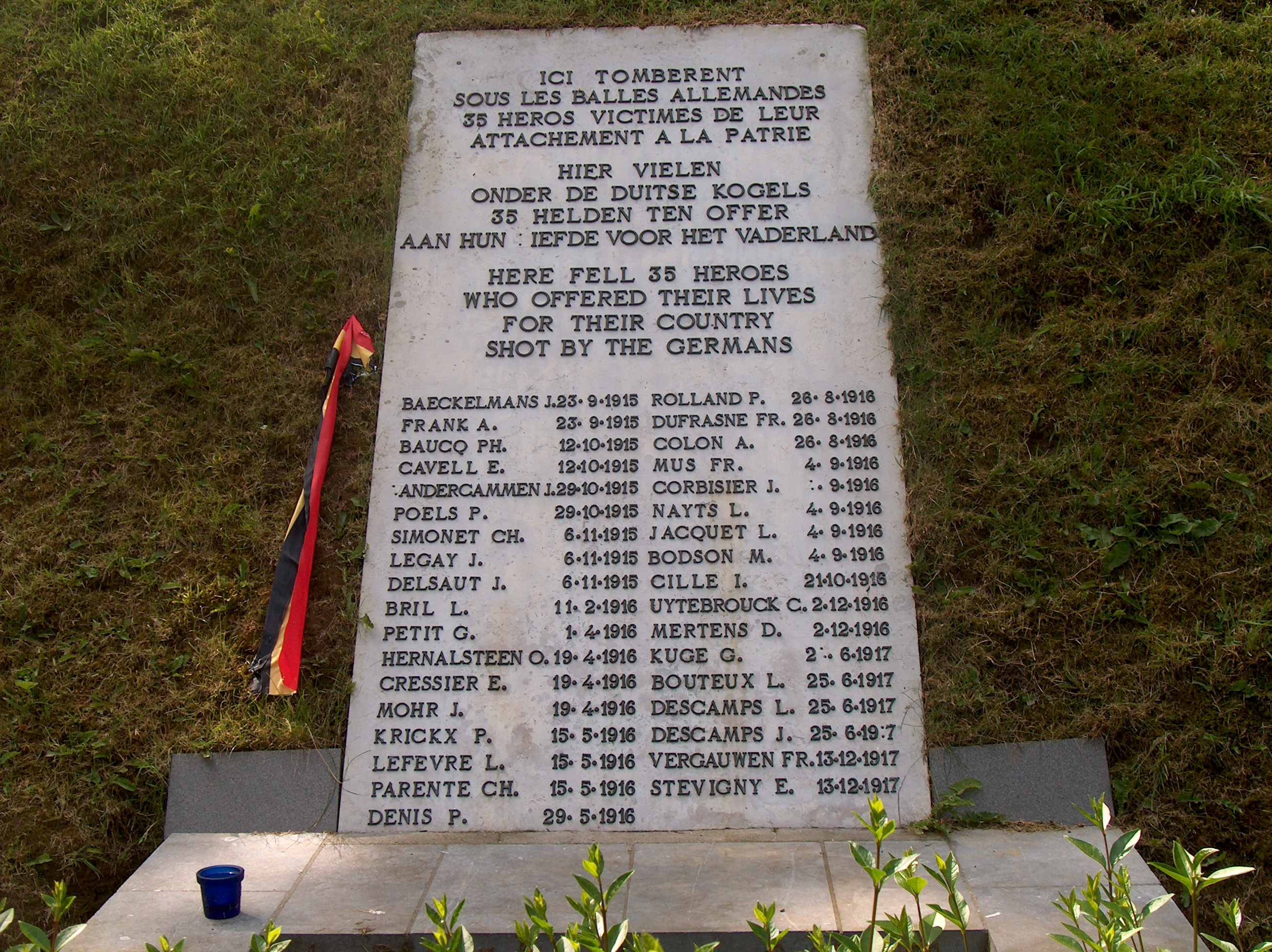
War memorial on the Rue Colonel Bourg/Kolonel Bourgstraat

=== World War I ===
- Philippe Baucq (shot 12 October 1915)
- Edith Cavell (shot 12 October 1915)
- Gabrielle Petit (shot 1 April 1916)

=== World War II ===
- Abraham Fogelbaum (shot 21 January 1942)
- Adelin Hartveld (shot 21 January 1942)
- Victor Thonet (shot 20 April 1943)
- André Bertulot (shot 10 May 1943)
- Arnaud Fraiteur (shot 10 May 1943)
- Maurice Raskin (shot 10 May 1943)
- Gaston Bidoul (shot 20 October 1943 – member of the Comet line)
- Emile Delbruyère (shot 20 October 1943 – member of the Comet Line)
- Jean Ingels (shot 20 October 1943 – member of the Comet Line)
- Robert Roberts-Jones (shot 20 October 1943 – member of the Comet Line)
- Georges Maréchal (shot 20 October 1943 – member of the Comet Line)
- Albert Mélot (shot 20 October 1943 – member of the Comet Line)
- Eric de Menten de Horne (shot 20 October 1943 – member of the Comet Line)
- Ghislain Neybergh (shot 20 October 1943 – member of the Comet Line)
- Henri Rasquin (shot 20 October 1943 – member of the Comet Line)
- Antoine Renaud (shot 20 October 1943 – member of the Comet Line)
- Edouard Verpraet (shot 20 October 1943 – member of the Comet Line)
- Alexandre Livchitz (shot 10 February 1944)
- Youra Livchitz (shot 17 February 1944)
- Lucien Orfinger (shot 26 February 1944)
- Anton Winterink (shot 6 July 1944)

== See also ==
- History of Brussels
- Belgium in the long nineteenth century
- List of inmates of Saint-Gilles Prison
