= Adelin Hartveld =

Belgian lawyer, writer and Resistance member executed in 1942

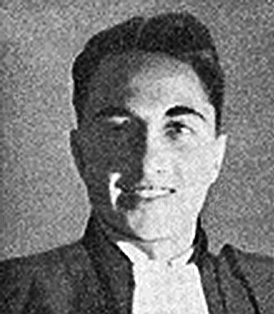
(undated)

Adelin Hartveld (born 6 March 1917 in Antwerp; died 21 January 1942 in Schaerbeek) was a young Brussels lawyer and writer. A member of the Belgian Resistance during the Second World War under the pseudonym Defacqz, he was executed by the Germans at the Tir national on 21 January 1942.

== Biography ==
The son of the art dealer Samuel Hartveld, Adelin Hartveld was born in Antwerp in 1917. In 1935, at the age of eighteen, he achieved an early literary success with the publication of Alors seulement. At that time, he frequented the Plisnier Salon on Place Morichar in Saint-Gilles.

He began studying law at the Université libre de Bruxelles, but after being mobilised he was never able to complete his degree. Following the 18-Day Campaign in May 1940, he became involved in the Resistance. His network consisted of about a dozen people whose pseudonyms were street names, taken either from where they lived or from the location of the café they frequented. Hartveld’s pseudonym was Defacqz.

Hartveld established contact with patriots imprisoned by the Germans and gathering information about their plans. In January 1941, having decided to reach London as a prospective pilot, he was arrested along with ten others with the same intention and was transferred to Saint-Gilles prison. On 15 September 1941, he was sentenced to death.

Adelin Hartveld was executed, on the same day as Abraham Fogelbaum, at the Tir national in Schaerbeek on 21 January 1942.

A notice in the clandestine Libre Belgique ("Peter Pan") of 15 February 1942 listed the names of those executed. The bâtonnier Braffort, showing notable courage, wrote that he was still waiting for the formal death notice of these two colleagues who had fallen in the line of duty.

== Publications ==
- Alors seulement, Éditions Deplace, Koch & Co, Antwerp, 1935; R. Debresse, Paris, 1936, in Les Cahiers des poètes, 2nd series, no. 6.
- Note dans le contexte des droits de visite de grands-parents contre la volonté du père et de la mère (in Dutch), ULB, 1938.
