= Riek de Raat =

Dutch artist

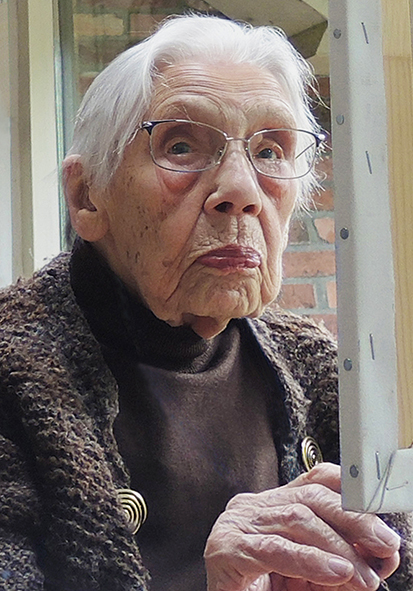
- Riek de Raat in 2016
- Born: 5 December 1918
- Died: 5 August 2018 (aged 99)
- Style: realism
- Movement: symbolism
- Spouse(s): Anton Winterink, later Herman Milikowski
- Children: Efraim Milikowski

Hendrika Geertruida (Riek) Milikowski-de Raat (6 December 1918, Amsterdam – 5 August 2018 in Eext) was a Dutch communist, resistance fighter and artist who specialised in realism and symbolism with a focus on figures. De Raat's work is exhibited at the Stedelijk Museum in Amsterdam and Museum De Lakenhal in Leiden as well as internationally.

== Life ==
De Raat was born into a Christian working-class family who came from the Jordaan district of Amsterdam. From an early age, De Raat wanted to draw but, being the eldest daughter in a family of five children, she had familial duties that left her little time for herself. Her father was unemployed for many years, during the crisis years of the first world war, which meant that she had to work to support her family, working after leaving primary school until the age of 14. In 1930, De Raat joined the socialist Workers Youth Central (AJC, Arbeiders Jeugd Centrale), the youth wing of the Social Democratic Workers' Party, becoming part of the Red Falcons, for the younger children. The AJC promoted socialist cultural ideals in its members that encouraged community values by singing, dancing, physical exercise and camping. One of her friends in the AJC, Alie Offenberg encouraged her to draw. In 1934, she joined the Society for Culture, Development and Recreation of the Communist Party of the Netherlands.

== Education ==
In 1936, De Raat studied at the Institute for Applied Arts Education (IvKNO) at the Gabriël Metsustraat in Amsterdam, for one evening a week. She then studied for two years at the Nieuwe Kunstschool (New School of Art); model drawing in the studio of sculptor Jan Havermans and later portrait drawing with Han van Dam. The school was active politically and taught its students the principles of the Bauhaus movement from Germany. It was founded in 1933 by Paul Citroen provided training that was strongly anti-fascist.

== Resistance ==
De Raat was a committed communist and remained so after the war. In 1936, De Raat began working for the International Red Aid (IRA). The IRA was a social organisation that was established by the Communist International organisation, to provide displaced communists with food and accommodation.

In 1938, De Raat met Anton Winterink, a Dutch communist who was a director on the executive of the Communist Party of the Netherlands. Two years later in 1940, the couple became life partner's. After the General strike of 1941, Riek de Raat and Winterink moved in together at their house at 8 Oude Looierstraat. Winterink became active in the Dutch resistance and later became part of a Soviet espionage network known as the Red Orchestra that operated in Western Europe. Winterink ran a network of agents in the Netherlands that was known as Group Hilda that had links to Dutch communist Daniël Goulooze. De Raat was also active in the Dutch resistance during the war but was unable to continue her art.

In 1940, De Raat became friends with Frisian artist Anneke van der Feer.

On 18 or 19 August 1942 (sources vary), Winterink was arrested by the Gestapo at a cafe in Amsterdam. De Raat returned home to find her house has been ransacked. She immediately went into hiding. De Raat hid at several addresses during the period from early 1943 to later 1944 in the Pijp area including with Mink Valk and his wife Mien Valk-Huijse, a working class couple from Diamantstraat area in Amsterdam. The couple along with their daughter Maria Geugjes-Valk who would later be recognised by Yad Vashem as Righteous Among the Nations. During the period she was in hiding, she was able to draw. Winterink was shot by the Germans on 5 July 1944.

== Afterwards ==
From early 1945, Riek resumed drawing with Jan Havermans, who lived in Sloterdijk. In the year after the war, De Raat lived in Abcoude where she worked outside with the artist friend Mien Nanninga. In 1946 she moved back to Amsterdam. While there, De Raat met the Dutch sociologist Herman Milikowski (1909-1989). Milikowski who came from a Polish-Russian Orthodox Jewish family was also a member of the CPN. In 1947, the couple were married and had a son, the photographer and graphic artist Efraim Milikowski. Milikowski had spent two years in six different concentration camps during the war. In 1946, the couple moved to the artists studio situated at 29 Bloemgracht, in Amsterdam De Raat continued to draw while at the Bloemgracht. Between 1946 and 1949, she worked with a group of artists and models that included Benno Premsela, Anneke van der Feer, practising drawing models. From 1947 to 1948, Riek attended evening classes at the Rijksakademie van beeldende kunsten (Rijksacademie), where she learned costume drawing and portrait drawing from Jaap Luttge. In 1950, De Raat designed some stamps for the Kinderuitzending of the Nederlandse Vrouwenbeweging (Children's department of the Dutch Women's Movement).

In 1953 the couple moved to Leiden While De Raat worked on her art, Milikowski, being unemployed, conducted research in the working-class neighbourhoods of Leiden on sociographics. De Raat was part of art collective Ars Aemula Naturae, where she drew models. During the year of 1954-1955, De Raat trained at the Vrije Academie voor Beeldende Kunsten in The Hague. She took further lessons during the next year, at the Royal Academy of Art, The Hague with Paul Citroen and Han van Dam.

Milikowski became famous, due to a study he wrote in 1961 that became known and was reprinted in 1967 as Lof der onaangepastheid (In Praise of Nonconformity). The study was part of his 1961 doctoral thesis, Sociale aanpassing, niet-aanpassing en onmaatschappelijkheid (Social adjustment, non-adjustment and unsocialness).

In 1972, the couple moved to Zaandam in the north of the Netherlands, when her husband started a new job at the Huisartsen-genootschap (Dutch College of General Practitioners) in Amsterdam. During this period, Riek continued painting. While on holiday at the campsite in Callas, she would draw portraits. Occasionally, she would draw a model, while at the walk-in studios, for example at the Van Gogh Museum in 1977 or at People's University of Amsterdam in Amsterdam in 1993.

In 1995, De Raat moved back to Amsterdam in Vondelstraat, where she continued to paint. In 2001, she made her last life drawing of a model, a study in red and black chalk that she completed at the "De Kunstgezellen". From 2011, until two years before her death, she stayed in the artists care home Rosa Spier Huis in Laren.

== Collections ==
The Museum De Lakenhal in Leiden has in its permanent collection a series of drawings by De Raat, of workers and workers' children in Leiden. Besides these drawings, the museum also owns portraits of Herman Milikowski from 1975 and a self-portrait from 2000. The Museum Henriette Polak has a later self-portrait from 2011 in its collection. The Amsterdam Museum added four paintings to its museum collection in 2009.

== Bibliography ==
- Milikowski-de Raat, Riek, beeldend kunstenares (2002). Riek Milikowski-de Raat : de kleur van de realiteit : een overzicht van 60 jaar werk [Riek Milikowski-de Raat: The Colour of Reality: An Overview of 60 Years' Work] (in Dutch). Eext: Atelier '92. ISBN 978-9080500211. OCLC 67851946.
