= Anton Winterink =

- The committed communist, Anton Winterink, around 1940.
- Born: 5 November 1914; Arnhem, Netherlands
- Died: 5 July 1944 (aged 29); Brussels, Belgium
- Cause of death: Shot in Fort Breendonk
- Occupations: Communist agitator, agent
- Organization(s): Communist Party of the Netherlands, Red Orchestra
- Known for: Resistance fighter

Anton Winterink (5 November 1914 in Arnhem – 5 July 1944 in Brussels) was a Dutch Communist. and a member of the Communist Party of the Netherlands. Winterink was a core member of an anti-Nazi Soviet espionage group in Belgium that came to be known as the Red Orchestra by the Abwehr. He worked as a radio operator for the Soviet espionage group's that was associated with the Soviet GRU officer, Konstantin Jeffremov, in 1940. Winterink used the alias Tino to disguise his identity. In late 1940, Winterink established an espionage organisation based in Amsterdam, that became known as Group Hilda that operated until early 1943. Winterink was arrested on 18 August 1942 by the Sonderkommando Rote Kapelle in Amsterdam. After being interrogated and involved in an attempt at Funkspiel, he was shot four months later at the Tir national military firing-range in Brussels.

== Life ==
Around 1938, Winterink met the artist Riek de Raat, at the home of De Raat's friend, Rita Storck. Two years later, in 1940, the couple became life partner's. After the General strike of 1941, Riek de Raat and Winterink moved in together, hiding at their house at 8 Oude Looierstraat.

== Career ==
In 1933, Winterink was one of three officials that ran the Netherlands branch of the International Red Aid, a social organisation that helped displaced communists with food and accommodation. At the time, Winterink and many other members of the CPN were involved in raising aid money to buy food and clothing for communist refugees from Germany. In the 1930s, Winterink was an important functionary of Rote Hilfe in the Netherlands.

In late 1936 or early 1937 (sources vary), Soviet GRU agent Johann Wenzel moved to the Netherlands, where he made contact with Daniël Goulooze and they discussed plans for the construction of a radio network in the Netherlands. Goulooze was director of the Communist Party of the Netherlands (CPN) and who acted as the main liaison officer between the CPN and the Communist International (Comintern) in Moscow. In late 1938, Wenzel again visited Goulooze to recruit potential candidates for work in Belgium. Goulooze recommended Winterink, who was taken to Brussels where he was trained by Wenzel in Soviet wireless telegraphy procedures and ciphers. Winterink was recruited to work in the Jeffremov group in Belgium and worked for the group for most of 1940. During that period Winterink made frequent trips back to the Netherlands where he established another espionage group. In later 1940, he was ordered to return the Netherlands and take charge of the network that operated under the name of Group Hilda. The most important members of the group were Maurice Peper who was the main courier between Winterink in Amsterdam and Jeffremov in Brussels, Adam Nagel and Wilhelm Voegeler who were radio operators along with Jakob Hillbolling, an agent who organised safehouse and accommodation and Hendrika Smith, the liaison to the Communist Party of the Netherlands. During the whole period of its existence, Group Hilda was controlled by Jeffremov in Brussels. From late 1940 to mid-1942, Group Hilda supported a two-way radio link with Moscow via the Soviet embassy in London with the help three radios.

The espionage groups that Winterink was involved with.

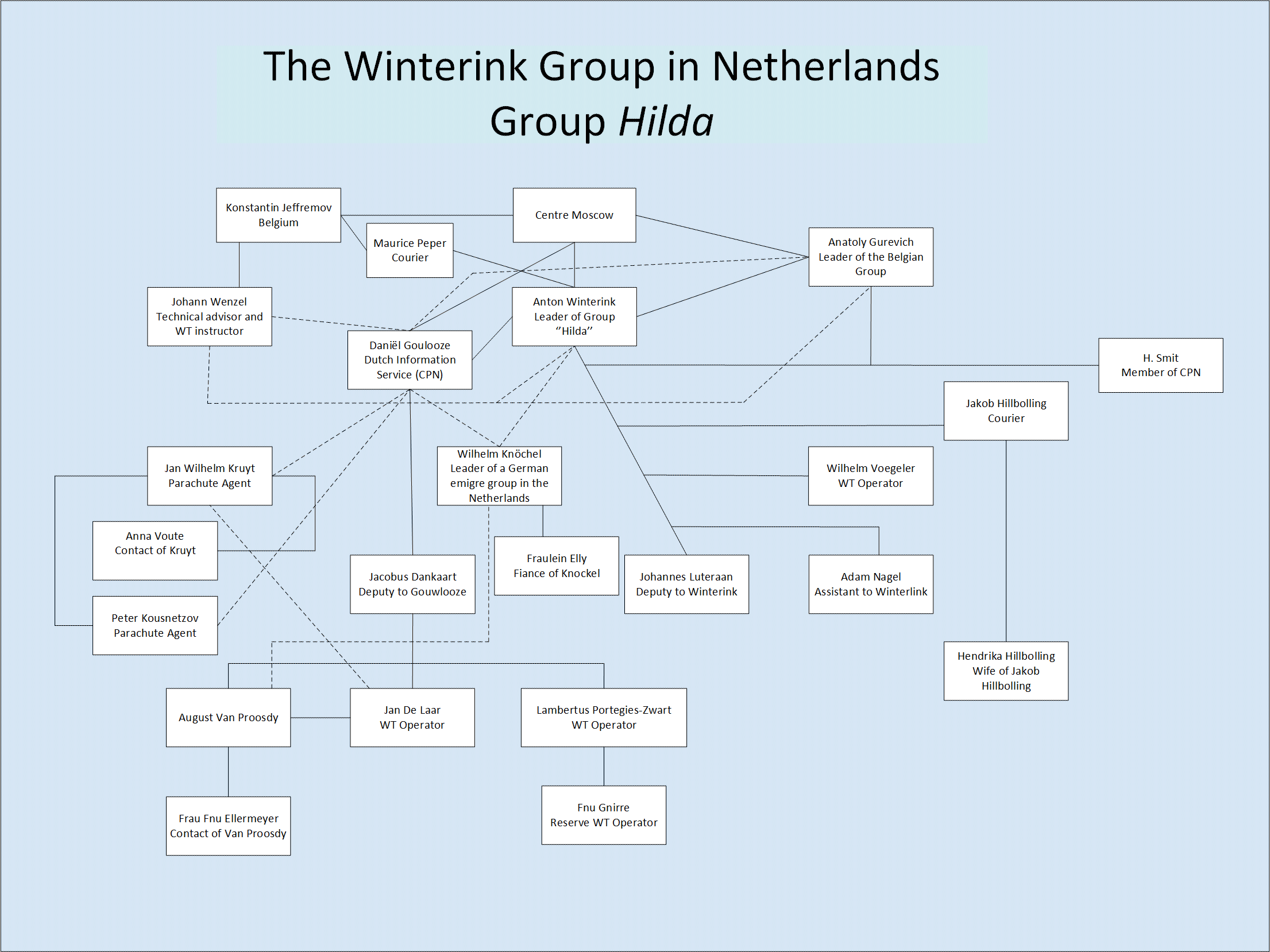
The Winterink group in the Netherlands.

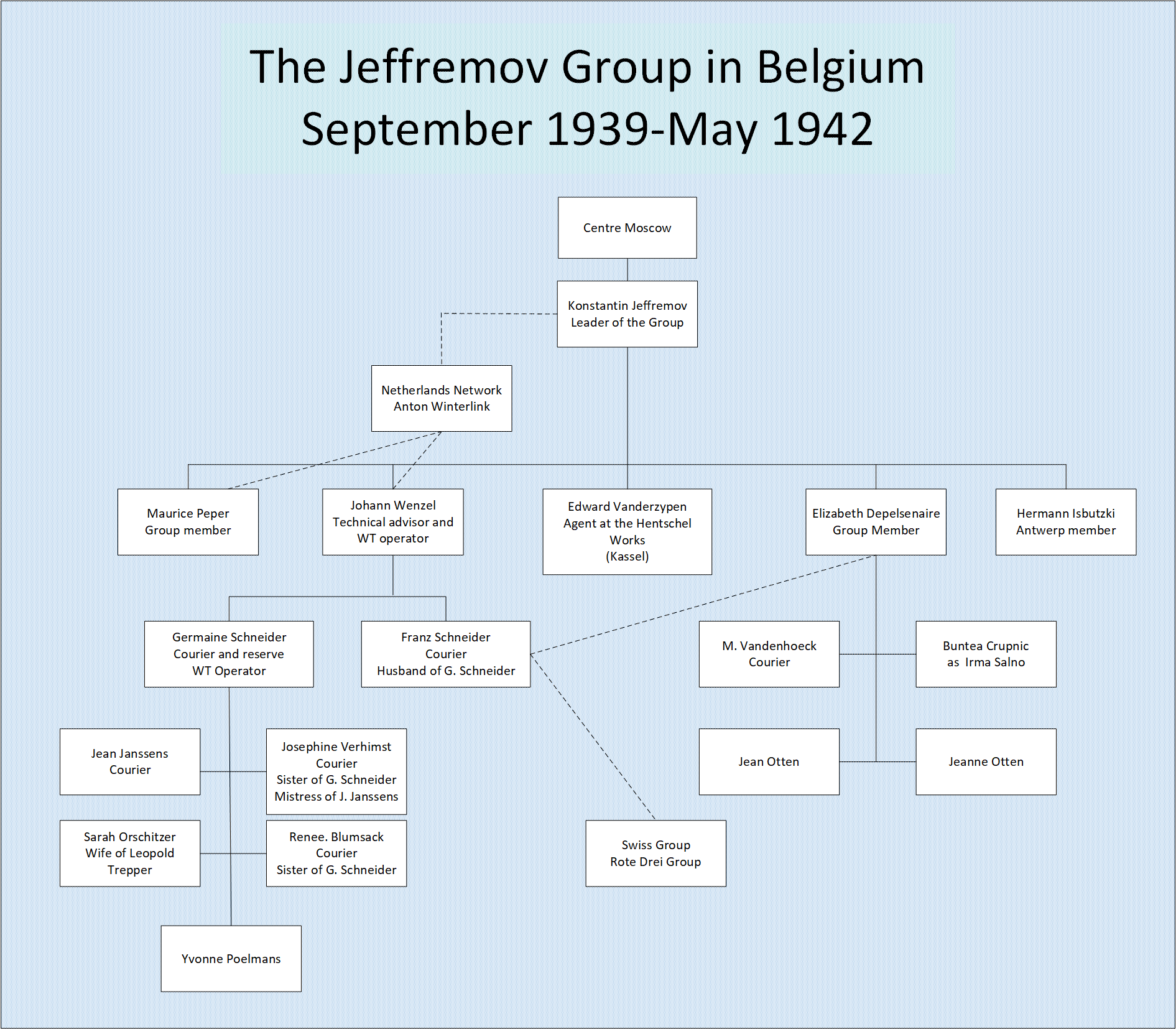
The Jeffremov group 1939-1942

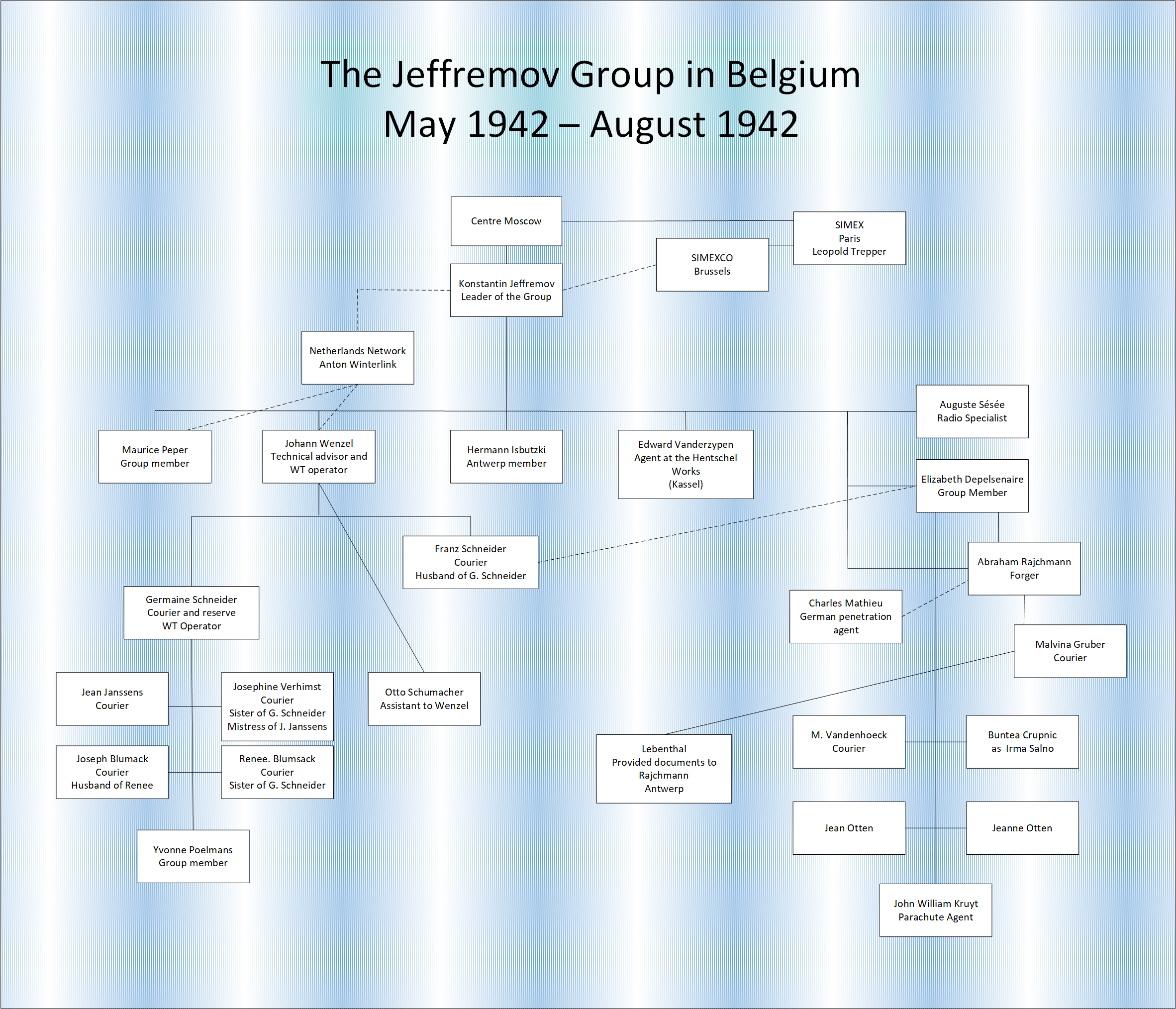
The Jeffremov Group after it was reorganised

== Arrest ==
On 18 or 19 August 1942 (sources vary), Winterink was arrested by the Gestapo from the Sonderkommando Rote Kapelle, at a cafe in Amsterdam. Nine members of the group with two remaining radio transmitters were never discovered and continued to work. A total of 17 people from Winterink's group were arrested. Winterink was sent to a prisoner-of-war camp (Kriegs Wehrmacht prison) in Brussels, before being sent to Fort Breendonk. He was interrogated and tortured for two weeks by the Sonderkommando in Brussels, after which he agreed to work for the Abwehr. Winterink took part in a Funkspiel operation. His radio station, that was known as Beam Tanne, began transmitting in September 1943. In March 1944, Winterink's Funkspiel operation was abandoned. The German funkspiel operation was largely a failure. Four months later on the 5 July 1944, Winterink was shot at the Tir national firing-range in Brussels. where he was buried anonymously. The grave site is single grave 312 in row II.

== Bibliography ==
- Perrault, Gilles (1990). Auf den Spuren der Roten Kapelle (in German) (Revised, New ed.). Wien: Europaverl. ISBN 9783203512327. OCLC 75468124.
- Trepper, Leopold (1978). Die Wahrheit Autobiographie; mit 24 Bilds. u. zahlr. Dokumenten im Anh. dtv, 1387 (in German) (Ungekürzte Ausg ed.). München: Deutscher Taschenbuch-Verlag. p. 371. ISBN 9783423013871. OCLC 74449504.
- Coppi Jr., Hans (July 1996). Dietrich Bracher, Karl; Schwarz, Hans-Peter; Möller, Horst (eds.). "Die Rote Kapelle" [The Red Orchestra in the field of conflict and intelligence activity, The Trepper Report June 1943] (PDF). Quarterly Books for Contemporary History (in German). 44 (3). Munich: Institute of Contemporary History. ISSN 0042-5702. Archived from the original (PDF) on 18 May 2015.
- Колпакиди, Александър (2001). Империята ГРУ [Imperium GRU] (in Bulgarian). TRUD Publishers. p. 216. ISBN 978-954-528-267-6.

== Sources ==
- Kesaris, Paul. L, ed. (1979). The Rote Kapelle: the CIA's history of Soviet intelligence and espionage networks in Western Europe, 1936-1945. Washington DC: University Publications of America. ISBN 0-89093-203-4.
