= Maurice Peper =

Soviet intelligence officer

Maurice Peper

Maurice Peper (born April 1906 in Amsterdam (Note: (Sources vary) Kesaris gives the date of birth as 12 December 1899.), died 28 July 1943 in Plötzensee Prison) was a Dutch Jewish diamond cutter of émigré Polish Jewish parents. He became a communist and then Soviet GRU military intelligence officer, known as a scout in Soviet intelligence parlance. Peper was a specialist in wireless telegraphy and used the aliases Wassermann and Hollander to disguise his identity in messages.

== Career ==
Until 1940, Peper worked as a wireless telegraphy operator for a commercial steamship company and was a member of the Dutch Maritime Union.

== Espionage ==
In 1938, Peper was recruited by Dutch communist Hermann Isbutsky. Between late 1940 and July 1942, Peper worked first for Soviet agent Anatoly Gurevich and then in the same period, Soviet agent Konstantin Jeffremov as a courier who operated between Johann Wenzel in Brussels and Anton Winterink in Amsterdam. Peper was one of three people who maintained the liaison channel between Brussels and Amsterdam, the other two people were Jacob and Henrika Hillbolling.

The espionage groups that Peper was involved with.

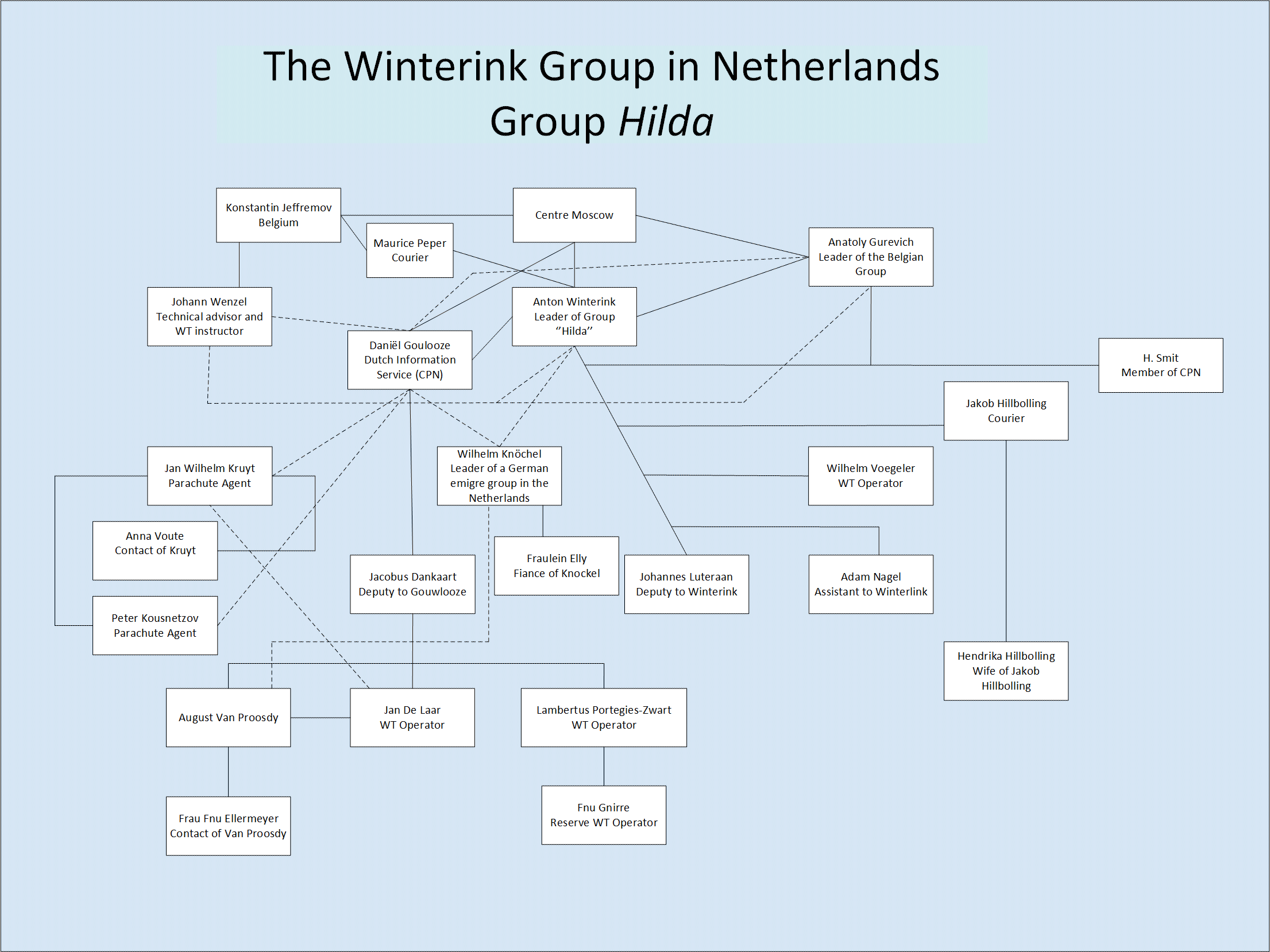
The Winterink group in the Netherlands.

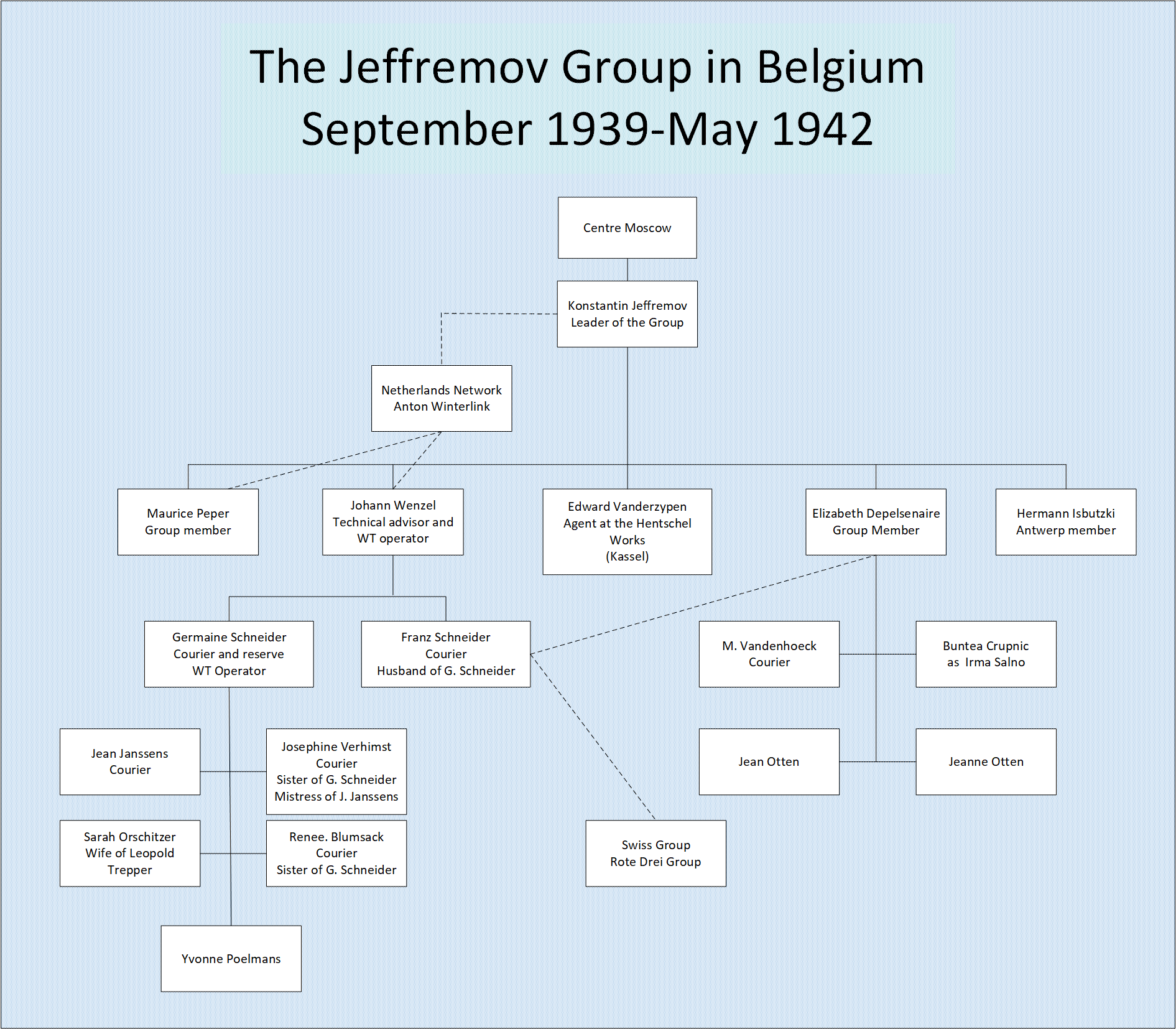
The Jeffremov group 1939-1942

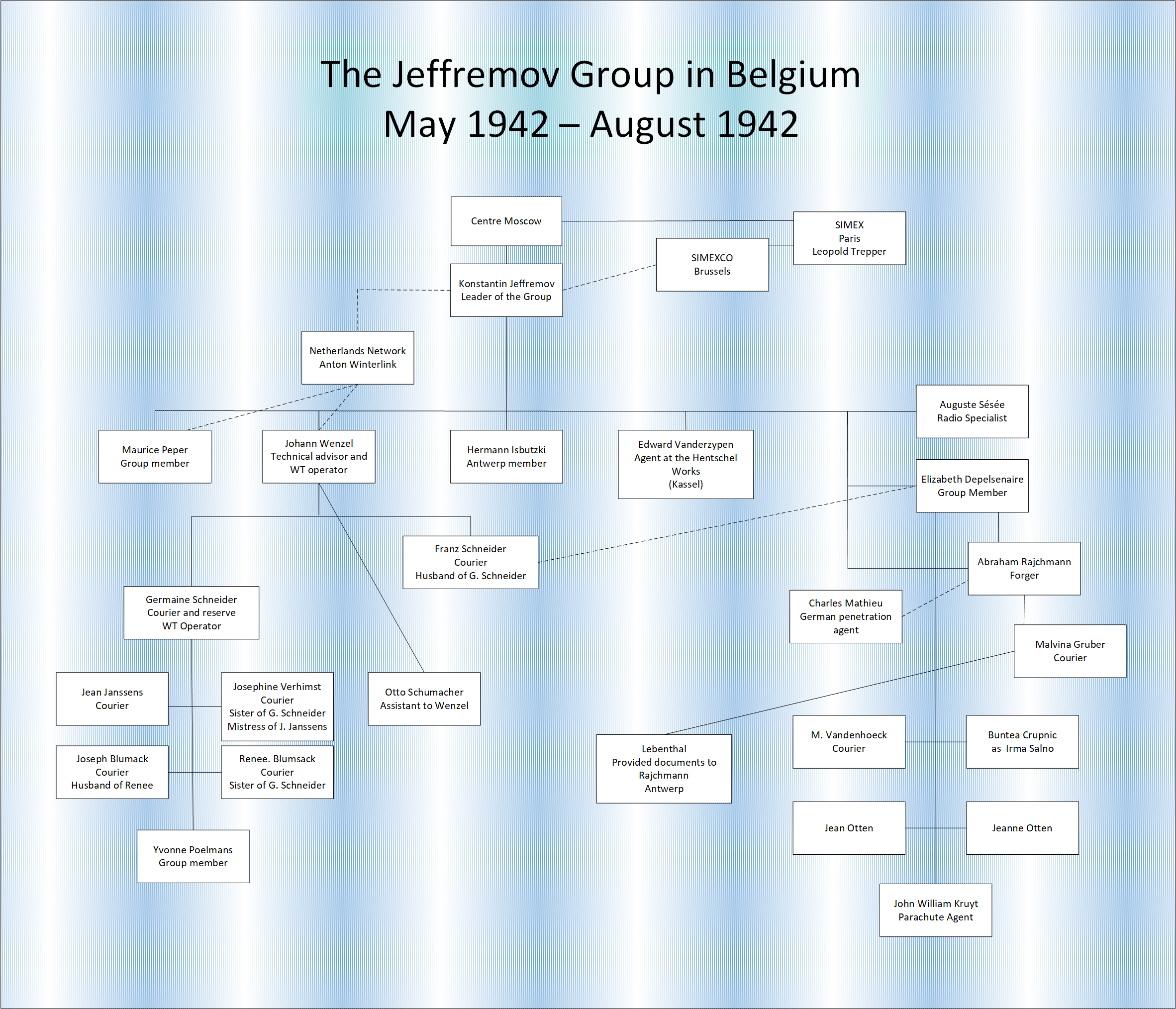
The Jeffremov Group after it was reorganised

== Arrest and betrayal ==
On 25 July 1942, Peper was arrested by Abwehr officer Henry Piepe in Brussels. Peper was betrayed by Jeffremov, who had himself been arrested by the Gestapo agents of Sonderkommando Rote Kapelle on 22 July 1942 in Brussels. Jeffremov informed the Sonderkommando of a covert meeting, known as a treff that was to take place in a Brussels street by Peper and Belgian Hermann Isbutsky, where they were both arrested While Isbutsky refused to cooperate with the Sonderkommando and paid the price by being heavily tortured at Fort Breendonk, Peper agreed to work for the Sonderkommando and revealed that he was to meet Dutchman Anton Winterink a few days later in Amsterdam who was subsequently arrested. Peper also betrayed Augustin Sésée, the reserve radio operator in the Jeffremov network, who was arrested in August 1942.
