= Marina Chafroff =

Belgian resistance fighter

Marina Aleksandrovna Chafroff-Mourataïev (Russian: Марина Александровна Шафрова-Марутаева; 28 February 1908 – 31 January 1942) was a Russian member of the Belgian Resistance to Nazi occupation during World War II.

== Biography ==
=== Early life ===
Chafroff was born in Liepāja, in the Russian Empire (now part of Latvia), on 28 February 1908. Her father, a member of the nobility, was a naval officer in the imperial army and supporter of the White movement. Following the Russian Revolutions in 1917, the family fled Russia.

In 1928, her family moved to Belgium. There, she would begin working as a dental secretary and would marry Iouri Mourataïev, a radio technician and fellow Russian emigrant, in 1932. They would have two children together and would apply for Soviet citizenship in 1939.

=== Belgian resistance ===
Following the German invasion of Belgium in 1940, Chafroff joined the nascent Belgian Resistance. At first, she collected weapons left behind by retreating Allied troops, before using a radio hidden in her home to secretly listen to Allied radio broadcasts and clandestinely disseminating the information. She also participated in setting anti-tank obstacles on roads used by the Nazi military. However, she grew discontent with the range of Resistance targets, arguing that the Resistance needed to target Nazi personnel directly and not just infrastructure.

On 7 December 1941, a Nazi officer was assassinated in Brussels and the assassin escaped arrest. In response, the Nazi occupation authority announced the closure of entertainment venues in the city and took 60 Belgians hostage, threatening to execute them if the assassin was not revealed within ten days. On 15 December, Chafroff decided to surrender herself to prevent the executions, but stabbed another Nazi officer along the Boulevard Adolphe Max as she made her way to the Nazi authorities. During interrogation, she confessed to having perpetrated the first stabbing, saying that she had been motivated by a Radio Moscow speech given by Soviet leader Joseph Stalin calling for Russian partisans to attack Nazi soldiers.

On 20 December 1941, she was transferred to a prison in Cologne, in Germany, and sentenced to death. On 31 January 1942, she was executed by decapitation. Originally buried in the Westfriedhof cemetery in Cologne, her body was repatriated to Belgium in 1947, following the Nazi defeat, where she was re-buried in Ixelles Cemetery.

== Legacy ==
In 2023, Belgian journalist Myriam Leroy published a historical novel titled Le mystère de la femme sans tête based on Chafroff's life.
