= Saint-Gilles Prison =

Prison in Brussels, Belgium

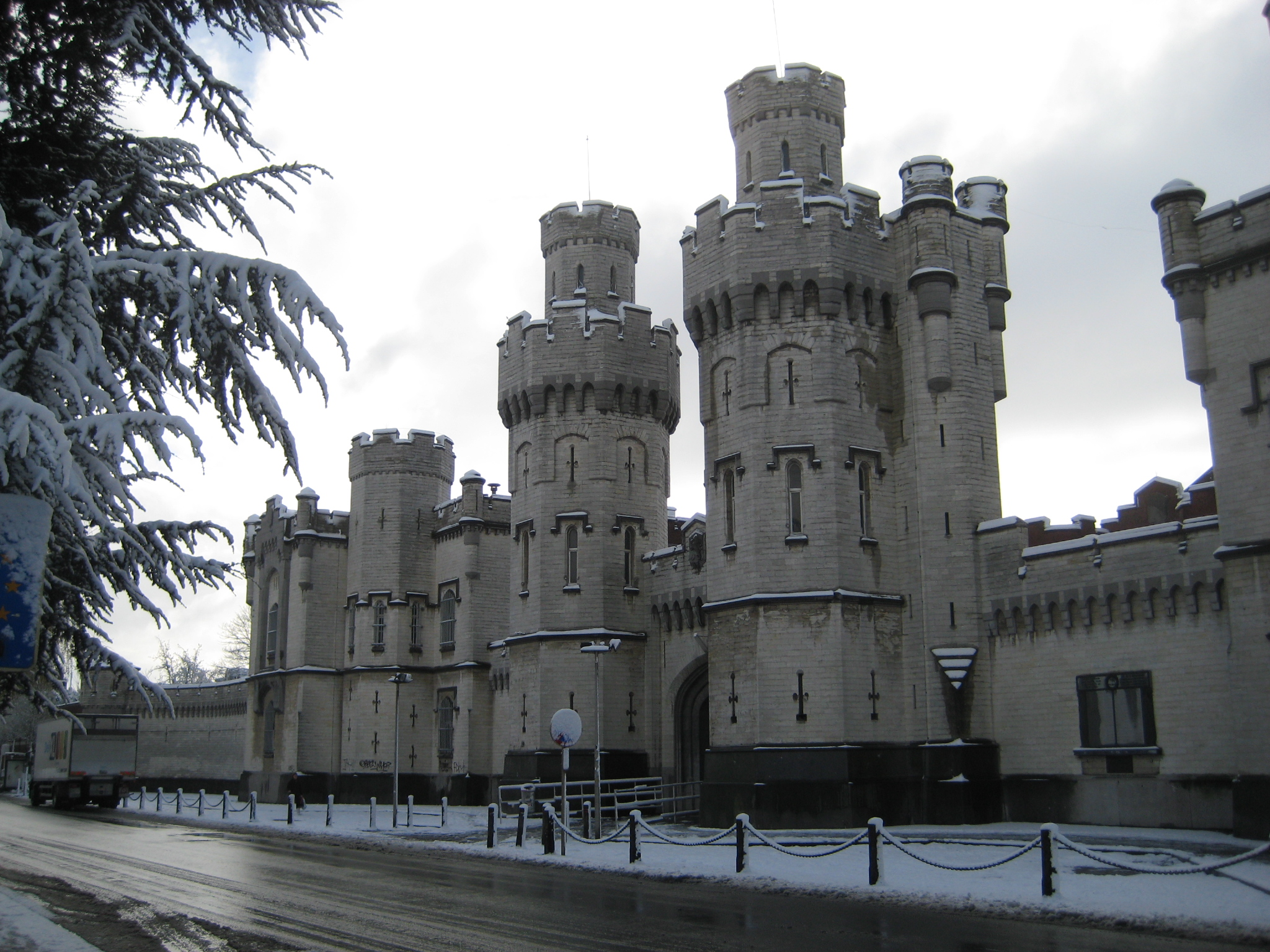
- Front entrance to Saint-Gilles Prison
- Interactive map of Saint-Gilles Prison
- Location: Saint-Gilles, Brussels-Capital Region, Belgium; 50°49′17″N 04°20′51″E
- Status: Operational (scheduled to close)
- Capacity: 750
- Opened: 1884

Notable prisoners
- Edith Cavell, Louise de Bettignies, Gabrielle Petit, Alexander von Falkenhausen

Saint-Gilles Prison (French: Prison de Saint-Gilles; Dutch: Gevangenis van Sint-Gillis) is a prison in Brussels, Belgium, that opened in 1884. It is located on the borders of the municipalities of Saint-Gilles, Ixelles and Forest, next to Forest Prison and Berkendael Prison.

Representative of the cellular system established during the 19th century, Saint-Gilles Prison was for a long time emblematic of overcrowding in Belgian prisons. Its infrastructure being in very poor condition, it was scheduled to close at the end of 2024, to be replaced by Haren Prison, but closure was postponed in February 2025, rescheduled for 2028.

== History ==
=== Inception and construction ===
The 1885 Saint-Gilles Prison cell design with hot water heating, ventilation, gas lighting, a fixed sink with running water, and a toilet bucket in a ventilated niche in the inner wall

During the period of the establishment of the Kingdom of Belgium in 1830, the country's prisons were made up a motley collection of buildings that were not destined to become places of confinement. This was particularly true of the many religious houses that had been confiscated as national property after the second French invasion of 1794 during the French Revolutionary Wars. In 1830, Édouard Ducpétiaux was appointed inspector-general of prisons for the Provisional Government, only a few months after the Belgian Revolution, and was assigned the task of organising the national prison system in accordance with the most modern standards. In 1848, the cellular system of imprisonment was adopted, when a decree established the principle of individual imprisonment into penal law. This led to a programme of prison building in the country from 1850 onwards.

Saint-Gilles Prison was first planned in 1883 to replace the Petits Carmes Prison located in central Brussels. The prison was designed by the Belgian architect Joseph Jonas Dumont and built by the Belgian-French engineer and sculptor Francois-Jacques Derre between 1878 and 1884. It is representative of the cellular system established during the 19th century. Originally a remand and sentencing prison, it housed people (men and women separately) placed under arrest warrant as preventive detention, as well as those sentenced to police or correctional sentences for the judicial arrondissement of Brussels. After it proved insufficient to fulfil this dual function, the new Forest Prison located next door took on the role of remand prison in 1909.

=== World War I ===
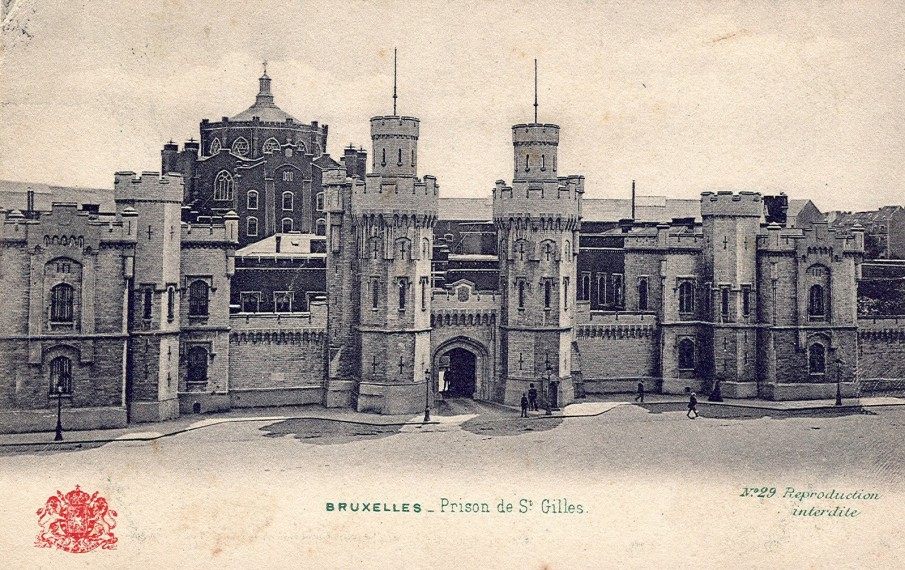
Postcard of Saint-Gilles Prison at the beginning of the 20th century

During World War I, with the exception of the territory behind the Yser river, Belgium was under German occupation. The Germans incarcerated at Saint-Gilles Prison those awaiting trial before the German Council of War in Brussels. Individuals who were "part of clandestine networks, others who had publicly protested against the abuses of the occupying forces, or those who had attempted to cross the Dutch border" were systematically sentenced to imprisonment. Some were transferred to Germany to serve their sentences. Several testimonies report violent treatment in the Brussels prison environment during this period, including cases of physical brutality, death threats and other acts of intimidation.

Among the most notable women incarcerated at the prison were the English nurse Edith Cavell, the French secret agent Louise de Bettignies, and the Belgian spy Gabrielle Petit. Petit's prison cell was preserved for posterity.

=== World War II ===
During World War II, a large number of opponents of the German Nazi regime were imprisoned at Saint-Gilles Prison, either at the disposal of the German police, or to serve a sentence, or prior to their deportation to Germany, most often to Buchenwald. An infirmary was set up in the prison during the war, allowing prisoners from Fort Breendonk to be treated there.

As Brussels was being liberated in early September 1944, an attempt by the Germans to deport 1,600 political prisoners and Allied prisoners of war from Saint-Gilles Prison to concentration camps in Germany via the Nazi ghost train was thwarted by Belgian railway workers and the Belgian Resistance.

After the war, the leaders of the collaborators and of certain political and military organisations, as well as propagandists and spies were locked up at the prison. Notably, General Alexander von Falkenhausen, military governor of Belgium and northern France during the occupation, was detained there from 1948 to 1951.

=== Later years and closure ===
In the 1980s, Jean Bultot, who was named in the Brabant killers case, was deputy director of Saint-Gilles Prison. In the decades that followed, many tensions arose at the prison, including due to overcrowding and staff shortages, leading to prisoner uprisings (such as in 1987 and 2009) and staff strikes. Since the 1990s, the prison has been overcrowded, with about eight hundred inmates (mainly pre-trial detainees). On 3 May 1993, the gangsters Murat, Lacroix and Bajrami escaped from the prison. They took then-inspector-general Harry Van Oers hostage, forced him onto the bonnet of their getaway car and drove out of the prison gate.

As of 2023, Saint-Gilles Prison is scheduled to close. The initial closing date was set for sometime in 2023, following the transfer of all prisoners to the newly constructed Haren Prison in north-eastern Brussels. However, the prison closure was postponed due to difficulties in recruiting prison guards at Haren Prison, with three cell wings in Saint-Gilles then scheduled to remain operational until the end of 2024. In October 2024, this planned closure was again postponed by a year until the end of 2025, and in February 2025, a further extension until 2028 was announced.

== Location and accessibility ==
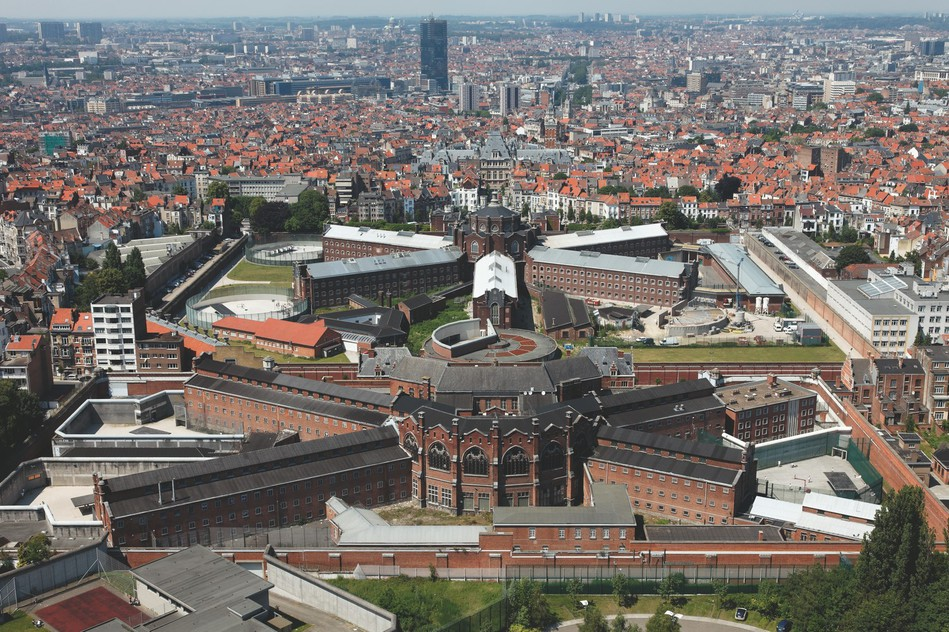
Aerial view of the prisons of Saint-Gilles (back) and Forest (front)

Saint-Gilles Prison is located at 106, avenue Ducpétiaux/Ducpétiauxlaan in Saint-Gilles, on the borders with Ixelles and Forest. The rear of the surrounding wall borders the Avenue de la Jonction/Verbindingslaan, opposite Forest Prison. The two prisons are connected by an underground passage used to serve to transfer prisoners. This close proximity causes frequent confusion between the two prisons in the media.

The Brussels-Capital Region has, in total, three prisons in the area: Saint-Gilles Prison, Forest Prison, as well as its women's quarter (known as Berkendael Prison), whose separate entrance opens onto the Rue de Berkendael/Berkendaalstraat.

== Controversies ==
=== Detention conditions ===
In terms of detention conditions, Saint-Gilles Prison is marked by chronic overcrowding. Despite slight improvements, reports from the European Committee point to an overcrowding rate that still hovers around 50%. In 2017, the annual report of the General Directorate of Penitentiaries reported that, since the prison took over its function as a remand centre in 2016, there have been 896 male inmates for 579 places, representing an average prison overcrowding rate of 48%. This situation persists and is the cause of numerous staff strikes, the main effect of which is to further deteriorate detention conditions.

Since 2020 and the outbreak of the COVID-19 pandemic in Belgium, the situation has become even more tense. The application of measures such as social distancing is impossible in an overcrowded prison: 903 inmates for 850 places on 24 November 2021, bearing in mind that this increase in capacity has only been achieved by putting cells designed for a single inmate into "duos" or "trios". This has led to the emergence of multiple "clusters" of infection, prompting the mayor of Saint-Gilles, Charles Picqué, to issue an order prohibiting new entries.

=== Convictions ===
On the Belgian judicial front, the main conviction stems from a judgment of the Brussels Tribunal of First Instance on 9 January 2019. The case was brought by the French- and German-speaking Bar Associations. The latter accused the Belgian state of serious failings regarding detention conditions at Saint-Gilles Prison. The judgement highlighted the problem of increasing prison overcrowding at the facility, which is in breach of Belgium's international and European commitments on prison conditions. At the end of the proceedings, the court ordered the Belgian state to reduce the number of inmates at Saint-Gilles Prison to the facility's official capacity. If it fails to do so, the Belgian state is also liable to the payment of penalties, the amount of which increases in the event of non-compliance by the state with the obligation imposed on it.

At international and European level, proceedings have also been initiated against Belgium. Indeed, the European Court of Human Rights has condemned the Belgian state for violating the European Convention on Human Rights through the detention conditions at Saint-Gilles Prison.

== See also ==
- List of inmates of Saint-Gilles Prison
- Red Orchestra ("Rote Kapelle")
- History of Brussels
- Belgium in the long nineteenth century
