= Gabrielle Petit =

Belgian spy (1893–1916)

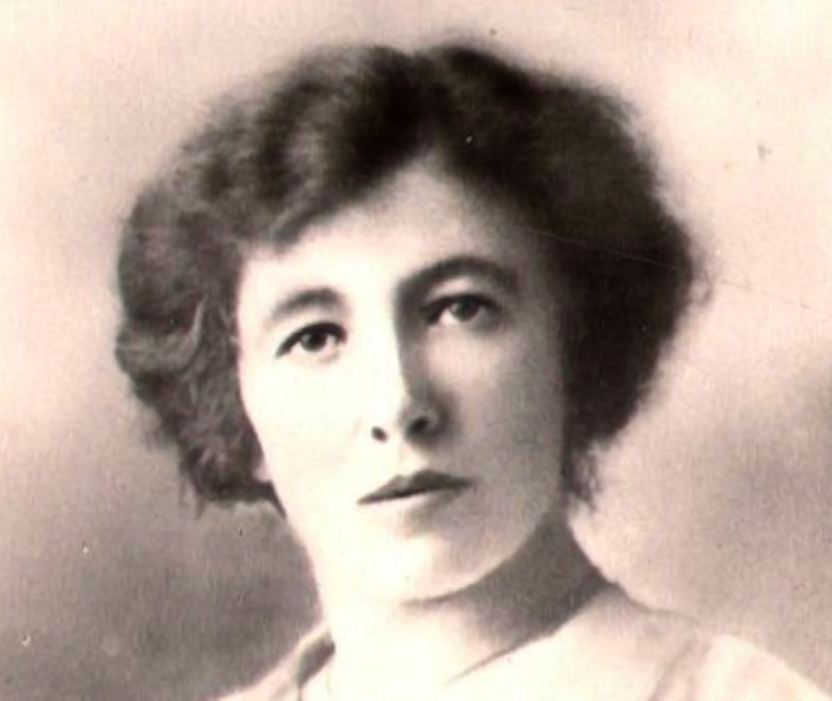
- Gabrielle Petit (c. 1910)
- Born: 20 February 1893; Tournai, Hainaut, Belgium
- Died: 1 April 1916 (aged 23); Tir national, Schaerbeek, Brussels, German-occupied Belgium
- Cause of death: Execution by firing squad
- Burial place: Schaerbeek Cemetery
- Military career
- Conflicts: World War I

Gabrielle Alina Eugenia Maria Petit (French: [ɡabʁijɛl pəti]; 20 February 1893 – 1 April 1916) was a Belgian spy who worked for the British Secret Service in German-occupied Belgium during World War I. She was executed in 1916, and was widely celebrated as a Belgian national heroine after the war's end.

== Life ==
Petit was born on 20 February 1893 in Tournai to working-class parents. She was raised in a Catholic boarding school in Brugelette following her mother's early death. At the outbreak of the First World War, she was living in Brussels as a saleswoman. She immediately volunteered to serve with the Belgian Red Cross.

Petit's espionage activities began in 1914, when she helped her wounded soldier fiancé, Maurice Gobert, cross the border into the neutral Netherlands to reunite with his regiment. She passed along to British Intelligence information about the Imperial German Army acquired during the trip. The British soon hired her, gave her brief training, and sent her to spy on the enemy. She proceeded to collect information about enemy troop movements using a number of false identities. She was also an active distributor of the clandestine newspaper La Libre Belgique and assisted the underground mail service "Mot du Soldat". She helped several more young men across the Dutch border.

Petit was ultimately befriended and exposed by a German agent for Colonel Walter Nicolai and the Abteilung III b counterintelligence service, who had posed as Dutch. She was arrested by the German military police in February 1916. She was imprisoned at Saint-Gilles Prison in Brussels, tried, and convicted of espionage in wartime under German military law, with the death penalty imposed on the following 1 March. During her trial, Petit refused to reveal the identities of her fellow agents, despite repeated offers of amnesty. Among such agents, Germaine Gabrielle Anna Scaron, aged 23, daughter of a local magistrate, and a close friend of Petit, was arrested with her on similar charges, imprisoned but spared and, despite the opposition of German military, released later for lack of sufficient evidence, which Petit had refused to divulge.

A devout Catholic, before dying Petit made her confession and received communion; on the way to her death, she recited the rosary. On 1 April 1916, Gabrielle Petit was, at the insistence of German military, shot by a firing squad at the Tir national execution field in Schaerbeek. Her alleged last words were: "I will show them that a Belgian woman knows how to die. Long live the king! Long live Belgium!". Her body was buried on the grounds there.

== Legacy ==
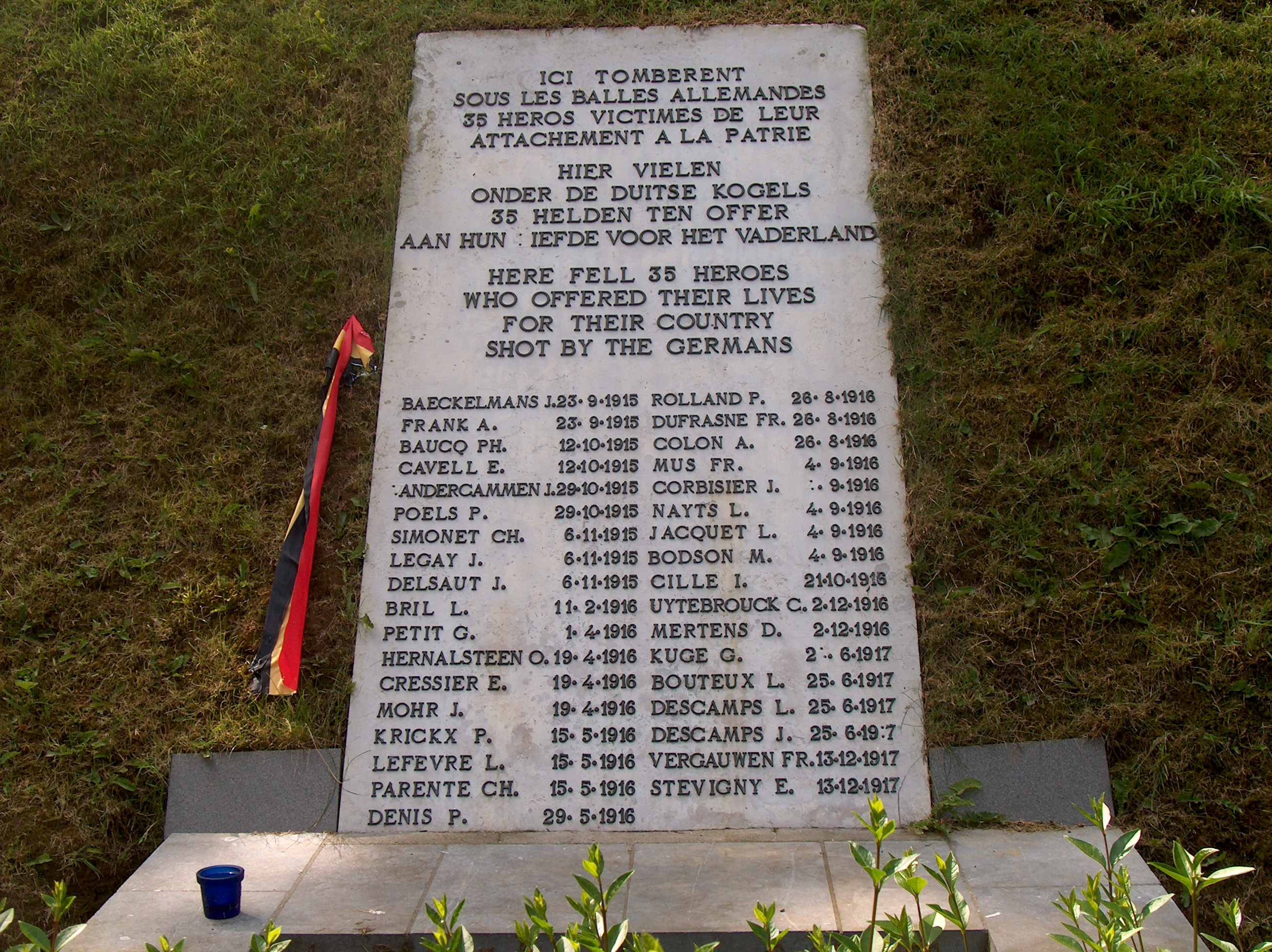
Petit's name appears on the war memorial at the enclosure of the executed, Schaerbeek

Petit's story remained unknown until after the war, when she began to be seen as a martyr for the nation. In May 1919 a state funeral was held for her, attended by Queen Elisabeth of Belgium, Cardinal Mercier of Brussels and Prime Minister Léon Delacroix, after which her remains (and those of fellow agents A. Bodson and A. Smekens) were buried with full military honors at Schaerbeek Cemetery.

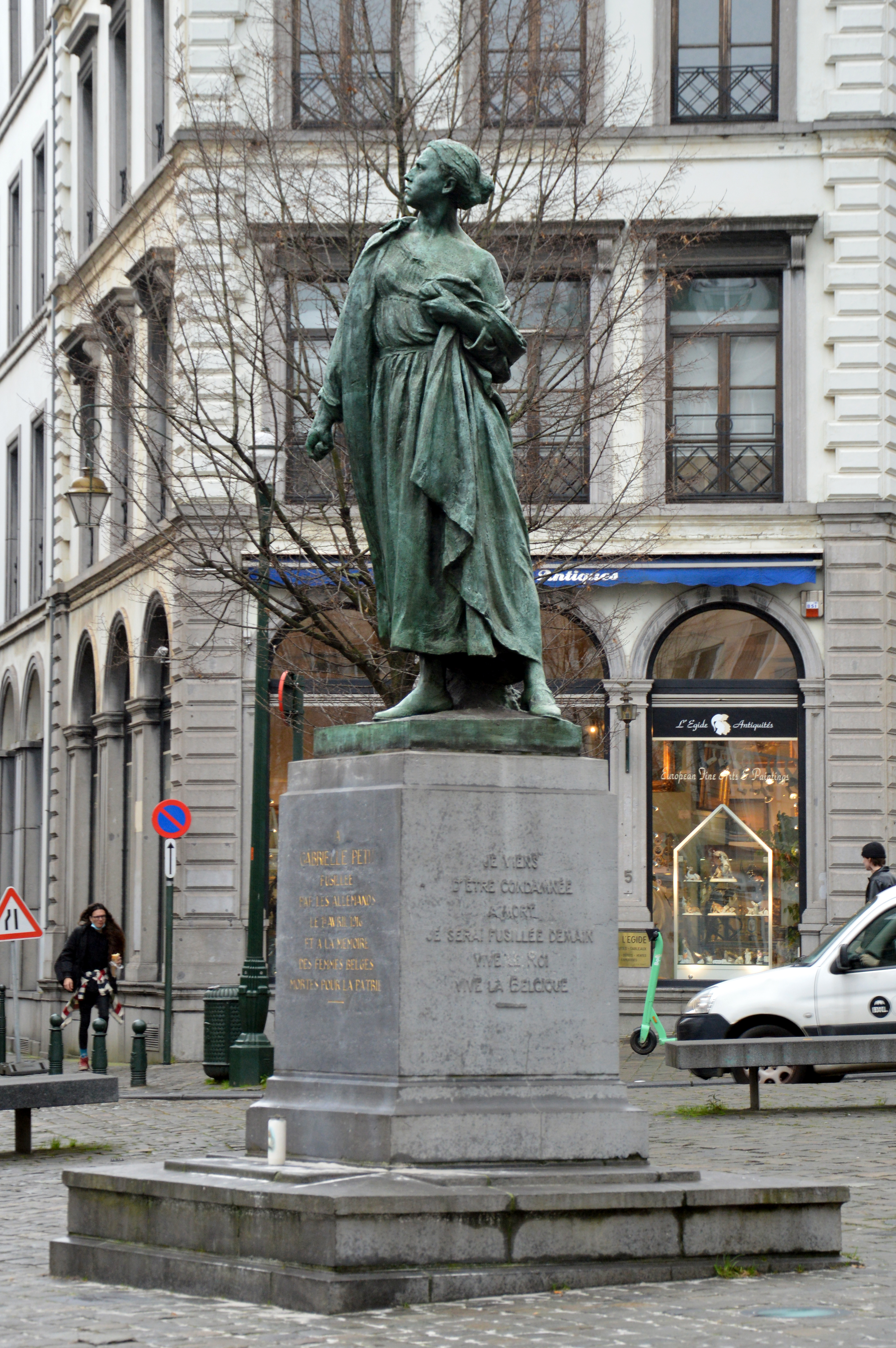
The statue of Gabrielle Petit in the Place Saint-Jean/Sint-Jansplein, Brussels

A statue of Petit was erected in Brussels and this was said to be the first of a working-class woman. In her native Tournai, a square was named after her. After the war several books were written and films were made about her life. The reference to Germaine Scaron stems from this commentator's family oral history. Scaron was but one of Petit's many acquaintances gathered during the two years of her active life as a British spy and Belgian heroine.

Author Kathryn J. Atwood, who included a chapter on Petit in her book, Women Heroes of World War I, wrote a 2025 novel titled The Belgian Girls based on Petit's life and wartime work.
