= Franz Schneider (spy) =

Swiss courier for the Red Orchestra (born 1900)

Anatoly Markovich Gurevich
- Swiss courier Franz Schneider
- Born: 19 February 1900; Basel, Switzerland
- Occupations: Soap salesman, Courier
- Espionage activity
- Allegiance: Soviet Communist International
- Service years: 1936-1945
- Codename: Niggi

Franz Schneider (born 19 February 1900 in Basel, Switzerland) was a Swiss militant communist and Communist International (Comintern) intelligence agent, who worked as a courier for a Soviet espionage organisation operating in France and Belgium during the interbellum and World War II, that was later known as the Red Orchestra. Schneider was arrested and sentenced to death in 1943 but pardoned due his Swiss citizenship.

== Life ==
In June 1920, Schneider migrated to Belgium, settling in Brussels in 1922. In the same year, Schneider was appointed as a travelling salesmen for the Societé Naturelle company in Antwerp. In January 1925, he married the Belgian national Germaine Schneider née Clais. The couple had a long honeymoon in Switzerland. In Switzerland, the couple were approached by the communist trade unionist Léon Nicole. and recruited into the Comintern. They also met Swiss communist leader Cigy Bammater who introduced them to Henry Robinson, a Soviet espionage agent who also worked for the Comintern. When they returned to Belgium two months later they initially settled in Liege before moving to Brussels in 1926. Upon his return Schneider found work with Natural Le Coultre, a Geneva based company specialising in the storage and transportation of fine art. Between 1925 and 1929, Schneider and his wife provided help to the Communist Party of Belgium and offered their apartment as a safehouse for travellers who were members of the Comintern. As Schneider was working, he had limited participation in his wife's work during this period. In February 1929, the couple was deported from Belgium as communist agitators. His wife made a clandestine return to the country after a short period, while he managed to remain in Belgium. In the same year, Schneider began working for the British Lever brothers company as a travelling soap salesman, eventually becoming department head.

In 1930, he returned to Zurich for a year, before returning to Brussels. In March 1931, the expulsion order was rescinded, enabling the couple to stay in Belgium legally. Between 1929 and 1936, the couple lived a quiet live to avoid both party politics and all activities that involved the Comintern.

== Comintern ==
In 1936, while the couple were living in Brussels, they were recruited as Soviet agents to work as couriers. In 1938, Schneider visited the courier Klara Schabbel, the lover of Henry Robinson in Berlin. (Note: The reason for the visit has not been stated.) In early 1938, (Note: Kesaris has conflicting dates for when Wenzel moved into Schneider's apartment, stating both early 1938 and 1939. The British intelligence report on the couple date the move as 1939.) the German GRU agent and radio operator Johann Wenzel moved to Belgium and resided with the couple to train Germaine in Wireless Telegraphy techniques. In 1939, the couple had been recruited into an espionage network Belgium and the Low Countries that was run by Soviet GRU intelligence officer Konstantin Jeffremov. Germaine Schneider was the most important of the two, working as a courier that involved extensive travel across Europe and was Henry Robinson's contact to Soviet agents in Great Britain. While she worked for Jeffremov, she couriered between Brussels and Paris. Franz Schneider was also a courier, but generally only between Brussels and Geneva, although he did visit the United Kingdom once. In August 1939, Schneider undertook his first courier work for Jeffremov group. As a travelling salesman for the Lever Brothers, he visited London and made contact with an intelligence source.

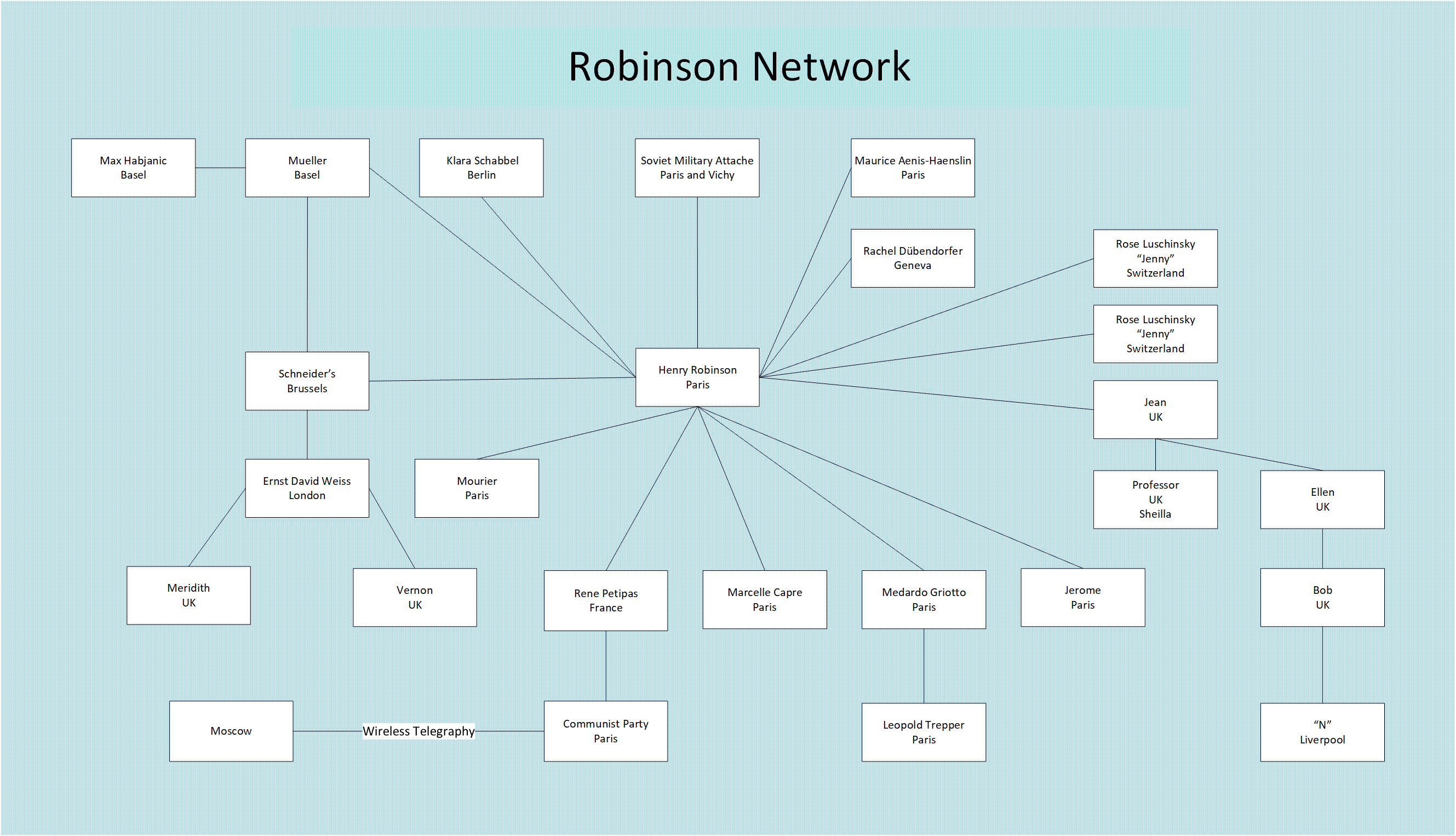
The espionage network of Henry Robinson that ran from 1937 to September 1941 before it was taken over by Leopold Trepper. Schneider worked as a courier between London, Basel and Paris.

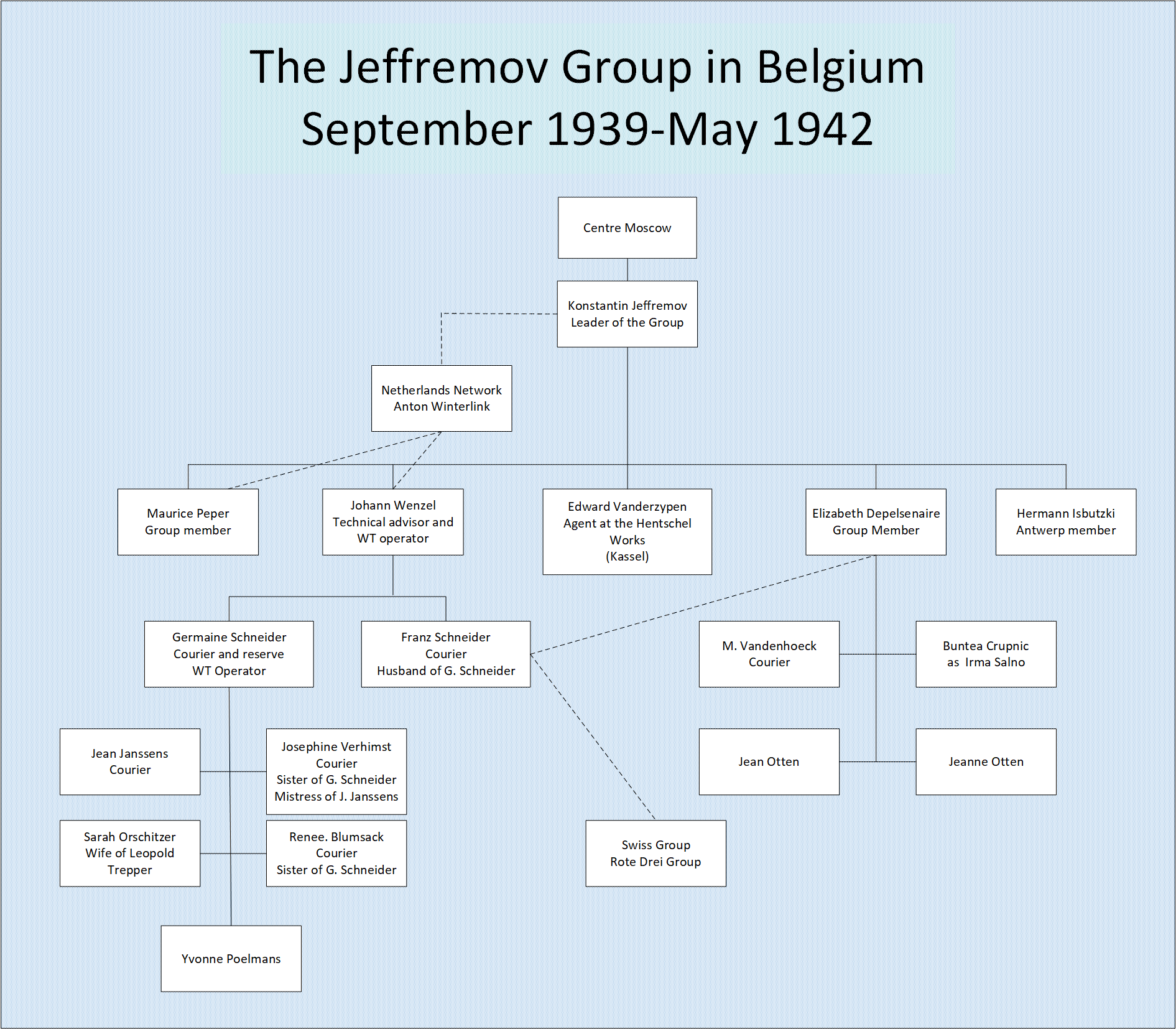
The espionage network of Konstantin Jeffremov that operated from September 1939 to May 1942. In the first Jeffremov group, Schneider worked as a courier between Switzerland and Brussels with his main contact being Elizabeth Depelsenaire.

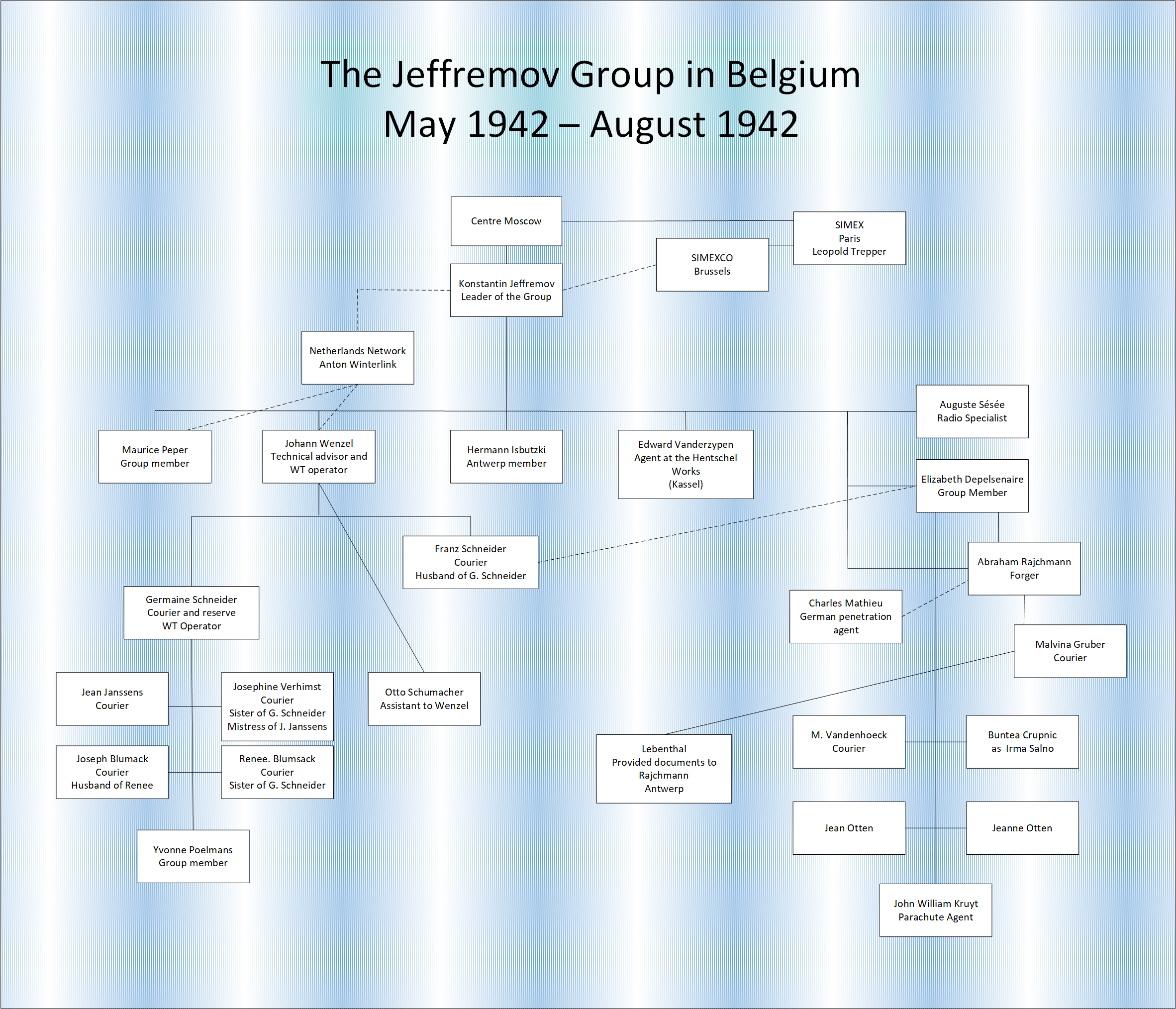
The second espionage network of Konstantin Jeffremov that operated from May 1942 to August 1943. By May 1942, Shneider was hardly involved in courier work.

== World War ==
In September 1939, Schneider began working under the direction of Jeffremov, as a courier between Brussels and Switzerland but continued to work with the Robinson network until September 1941. During spring of 1942, he couriered a radio transmitter to Auguste Sésée who had moved from Ostend to Brussels to work with Jeffremov.

The Brussels espionage network began to unravel when on 30 June 1942, Wenzel was arrested by the Sonderkommando during the raid on the safehouse at 12 Rue de Namur in Brussels. Jeffremov was warned by Leopold Trepper, the groups director, to go into hiding and get a new identity. Schneider decided to stay in Brussels while his wife fled to France. Schneider asked a family friend Ernst Bomerson to hide Jeffremov at his apartment at 25 Rue Alfred Orban in Brussels for two weeks while his new papers were being prepared by the groups forger, Abraham Rajchmann. However, Jeffremov was arrested before he could go into hiding. In August 1948, in an interview with Basel police, he told them that he had met Jeffremov on 18 August 1942 at a railway station restaurant, who asked him if he would like to work with the Germans. Schneider refused and although he was followed, he managed to send a warning to Trepper. On 20 or 21 August 1942, Schneider was briefly detained by the Gestapo and interrogated but not arrested.

== Arrest ==
On the 30 November 1942, Schneider was arrested and taken to Fort Breendonk prison, where he was tortured. During his interrogation, Schneider betrayed is brother and sister-in-law Joseph and Renee Blumsack. They were arrested on 7 January 1943. Renee Blumsack was sent to Mauthausen concentration camp and died on 10 March 1945. Joseph Blumsack's fate is unknown but was likely executed. Schneider also betrayed his fellow courier Yvonne Poelmans who was arrested on the same day. She was sent to Mauthausen, then Bergen-Belsen concentration camp where she died. Schneider was sentenced to death but due to his Swiss nationality was imprisoned instead. In April 1943, he was transferred to Germany and kept isolated in several prisons before being sent to Brandenburg-Görden Prison and kept in the same cell as Maurice Èmile Aenishanslin, a Swiss communist and commercial director who was an agent of the network run by Henry Robinson. He remained there until the end of war, when he was liberated by the advancing Soviet front in May 1945. In the prison, he suffered from lung disease. The company Unilever, where he had previously worked, paid his salary until he recovered. By October 1945 he had sufficiently recovered to rejoin his wife in Switzerland. His wife, Germaine Schneider was also gravely ill after being imprisoned. She died a month later on 12 November 1945.

== After the war ==
By the spring of 1947, Schneider was living with Belgian communist and lawyer Elizabeth Depelsenaire in Anderlecht, Belgium. Depelsenaire formerly provided accommodation and safehouses for members of the Soviet espionage group that was associated with Jeffremov. Due to work, Depelsenaire eventually moved to Switzerland. In June 1947, Schneider left Belgium to join her in Neuchâtel, Switzerland. The couple were married on 2 August 1947. The couple lived in Switzerland for eight years, working as lawyers, but eventually separated and she returned to Belgium. By October 1948, Schneider was living in Zurich.

== Citations ==
=== Bibliography ===
- Bourgeois, Guillaume (2015). La Véritable Histoire de l'Orchestre rouge. Le Grand Jeu. Nouveau Monde. ISBN 9782369420675. OCLC 922305775.
- Coppi Jr., Hans (July 1996). Dietrich Bracher, Karl; Schwarz, Hans-Peter; Möller, Horst (eds.). "Die Rote Kapelle" [The Red Orchestra in the field of conflict and intelligence activity, The Trepper Report June 1943] (PDF). Quarterly Books for Contemporary History (in German). 44 (3). Munich: Institute of Contemporary History. ISSN 0042-5702. Archived from the original (PDF) on 18 May 2015.
- Gubin, Éliane (2006). Dictionnaire des femmes belges: XIXe et XXe siècles (in French). Racine, Brussels: Lannoo Uitgeverij. ISBN 978-2-87386-434-7. OCLC 71362867.
- Kesaris, Paul. L, ed. (1979). The Rote Kapelle: the CIA's history of Soviet intelligence and espionage networks in Western Europe, 1936-1945. Washington, D.C.: University Publications of America. ISBN 978-0-89093-203-2.
- Perrault, Gilles (1969). The Red Orchestra. New York: Schocken Books. ISBN 0-8052-0952-2. OCLC 1087114160.
- "Germaine SCHNEIDER". The National Archives, Kew.
