= Elizabeth Depelsenaire =

Belgian spy

Betty Depelsenaire
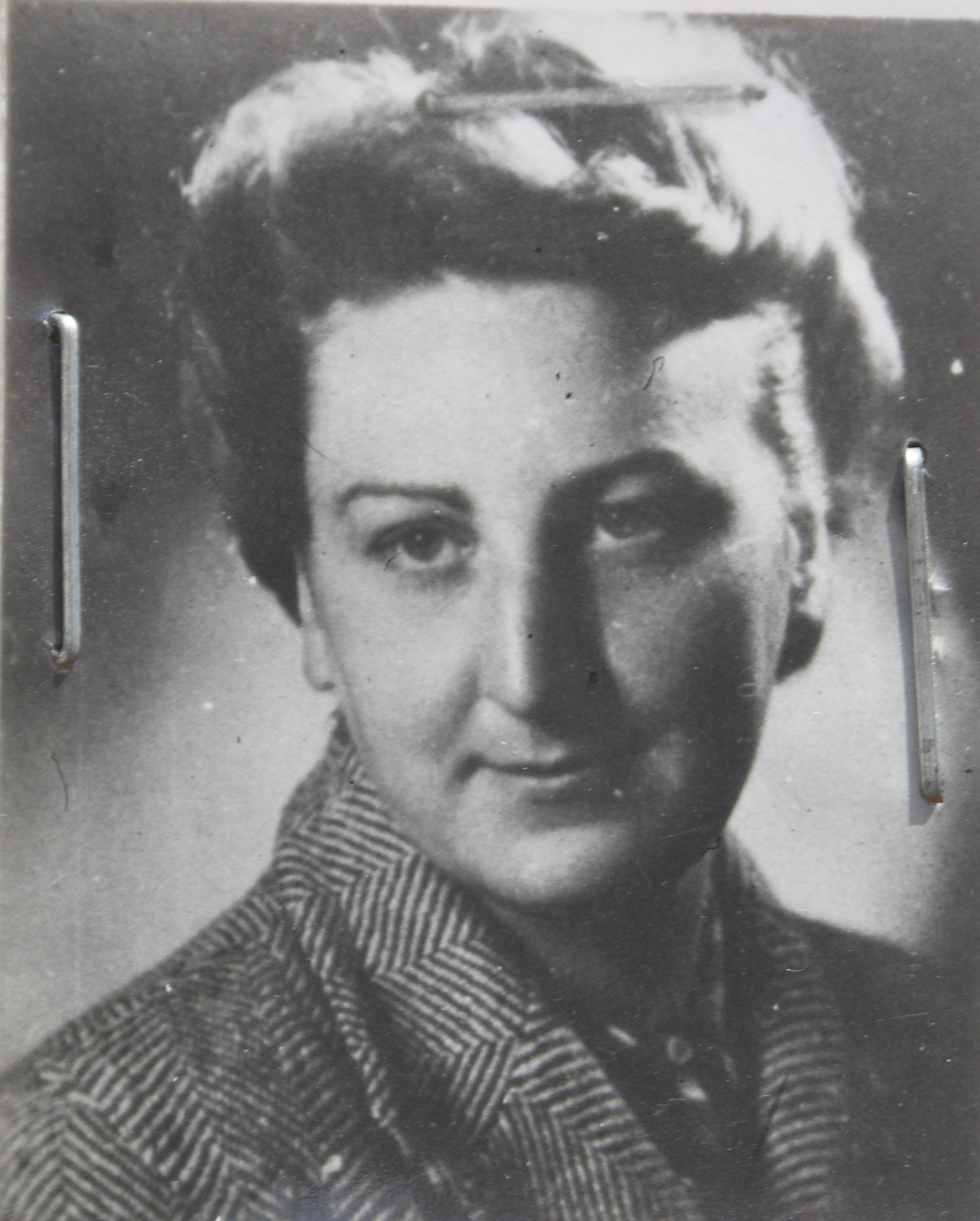
- Elizabeth Depelsenaire in January 1940
- Born: Elizabeth Sneyers; 23 August 1913; Bonheiden
- Died: 24 January 1998 (aged 84)
- Occupations: Lawyer; Resistance fighter
- Years active: 1939-1942
- Known for: Member of Red Orchestra ("Rote Kapelle")

Elizabeth "Betty" Depelsenaire (23 August 1913 – 24 January 1998) was a Belgian communist, lawyer and feminist. During World War II, Depelsenaire was a member of the anti-Nazi Red Orchestra in Belgium, providing accommodation and safehouses for members of the Soviet espionage group that was associated with Konstantin Jeffremov. Depelsenaire was arrested several times during the war, due to her activities and was finally imprisoned at Bützow, Germany. She survived the war and returned to work as a lawyer in Belgium. In 1946, she wrote about both her (and her friend, Miriam Sokol)'s imprisonment in Fort Breendonk.

== Life ==
Elizabeth Depelsenaire (née Sneyers) grew up in the bourgeois milieu in Bonheiden, north of Brussels. Her mother was Catholic and her father was a lawyer with politically liberal views. Depelsenaire was educated at a Catholic boarding school in Ghent. After passing the Jury Central (Note: A system of tests that make it possible to obtain the diplomas necessary, for the pursuit of education, for students who don't have the traditional education certificates that would normally be available.) entrance test, Depelsenaire began to study law at the Université libre de Bruxelles in Brussels.

While in university, Depelsenaire became an anti-fascist. After earning her law diploma in 1936, and graduating from the Université libre de Bruxelles, Depelsenaire began collaborating in producing the journal of the feminist, anti-fascist World Committee of Women Against War and Fascism organisation (part of World Committee Against War and Fascism). That same year, she joined the Communist Party of Belgium (CPB). In 1937, she married Belgian lawyer Albert-Emile Depelsenaire.

At the start of the war, the couple began to resist the Nazis. By 1940, Albert Depelsenaire was the auditeur-militaire (Note: In Belgium, the military auditor was equivalent to a military prosecutor.) in Brussels.

== Resistance ==
By September 1939, Depelsenaire had been recruited and working in The Jeffremov Group, a Soviet espionage organisation that was based in Brussels, Belgium. Depelsenaire was responsible for a sub-group in the organisation that provided accommodation and safehouses for couriers and agents in Brussels.

In 1940, Depelsenaire recruited the Belgian couple, Jean Otten, a salesman and his wife Jeanne Otten, a secretary at the Phillips Radio Company, into the sub-group. Other members of the sub-group were Buntea Crupnic, a lawyer and Marthe Vandenhoeck, a courier who worked between Paris and Brussels. In 1940-1941, the couple distributed communist leaflets and newspapers. Their activity was noticed and they were arrested on 10 November 1941. Albert Depelsenaire was deported to Germany and died in 1943. Depelsenaire was subsequently released.

On 24 June 1942, Depelsenaire organised accommodation for Soviet agent, Willy Kruyt and his son, John William Kruyt, who parachuted in Brussels with a radioset, with the intent to contact Jeffremov. In the less than a week, Kruyt was arrested and imprisoned. Kruyt betrayed the courier Marthe Vandenhoeck, who in turn betrayed the existence of Depelsenaire.

The two Jeffremov groups from 1939 to 1942

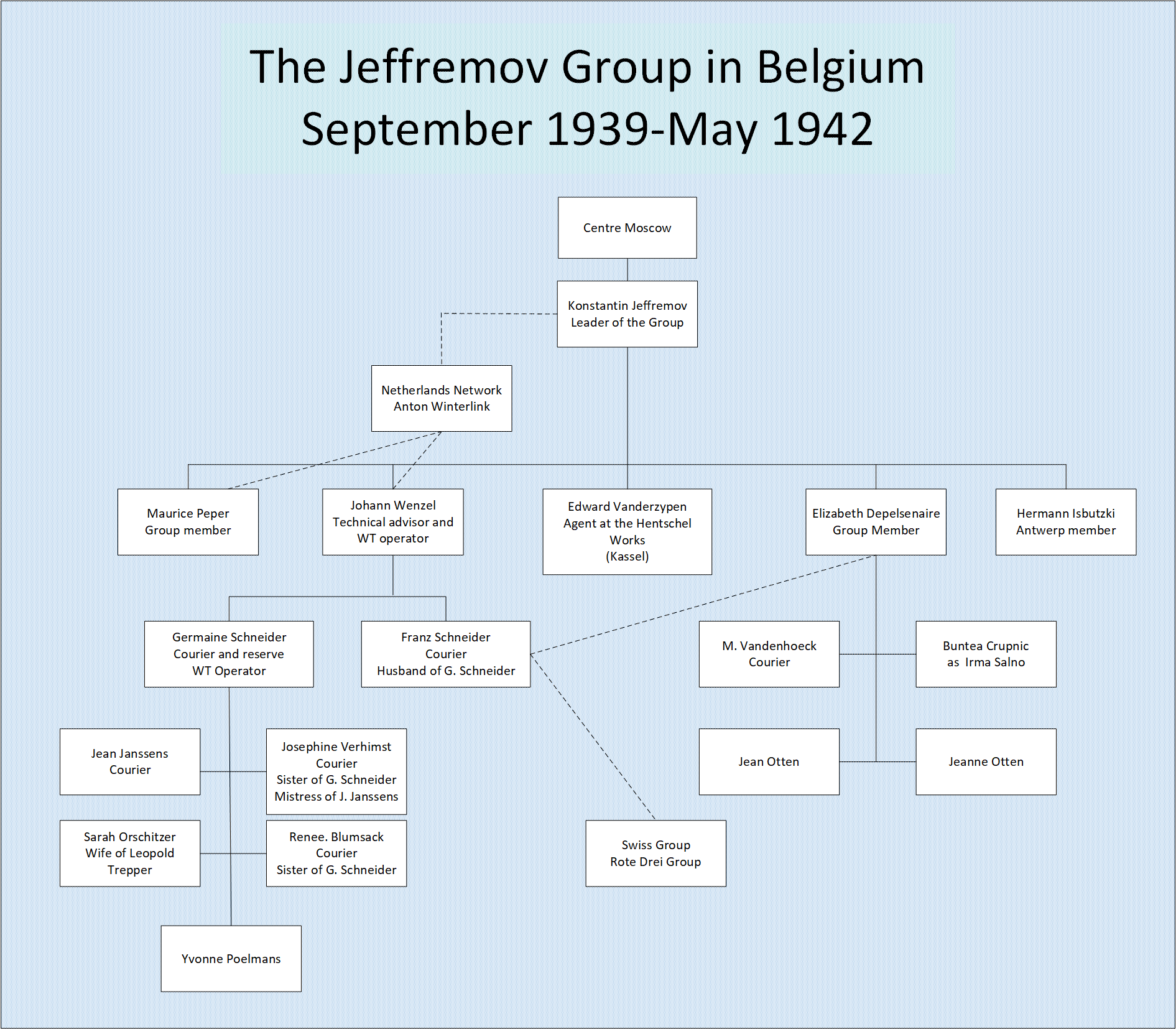
Organisational diagram of the first Jeffremov Group

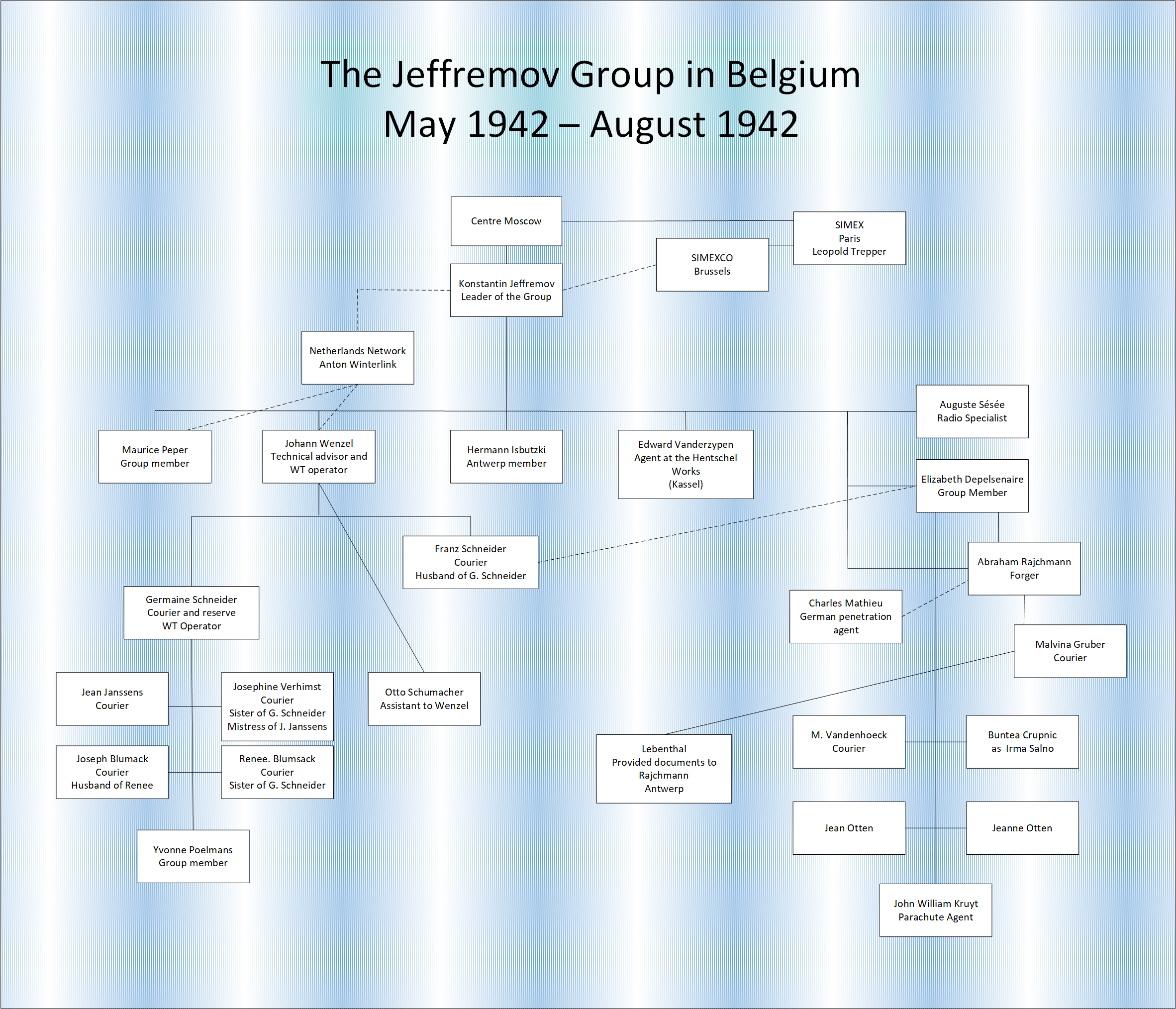
Organisational diagram of the second Jeffremov Group

== Arrest ==
Depelsenaire was arrested again on 13 July 1942, and imprisoned at Fort Breendonk military prison in Mechelen Belgium from September to Christmas 1942. She was tortured for three months, in Breendonk, a notoriously harsh prison run by the Schutzstaffel (SS). In December, she was transferred to Saint-Gilles prison in Brussels as part of the roundup of agents. In March 1943, she was taken to Germany by train to Berlin-Moabit prison together with other members of the Red Orchestra to whom she was accused of being linked. After a year, during the winter of 1944-195, Depelsenaire was transferred to Bützow prison in Mecklenburg, where she was liberated by the Red Army in May 1945.

== After the war ==
After the war, she testified at the Breendonk trials. Depelsenaire took classes learning communist ideology at the central school of the Belgian communist party. In 1946, she entered the election for the executive committee of the CPB, but refused to become a permanent member. Needing to make a living, she returned to working as a lawyer in Brussels. By the spring of 1947, Depelsenaire was living with Franz Schneider, a former courier of the Jeffremov group, in Anderlecht, Belgium. Due to work, Depelsenaire moved to Switzerland. In June 1947, Schneider left Belgium to join Depelsenaire in Neuchâtel, Switzerland. The couple were married on 2 August 1947. The Depelsenaires lived in Switzerland for eight years, working as lawyers. The couple eventually separated and she returned to Belgium. She remarried for the third time to a Luxembourger, Alphonse Rodesch, a former customs officer.

Depelsenaire remained a committed communist throughout her life. In 1960, she still had contact to the top echelon's of the Belgian Communist Party.

== Awards and honours ==
- Croix de Guerre with palms, for acts of resistance

== Bibliography ==
- Depelsenaire, Betty (1946). Symphonie fraternelle, vécue à Breendonck de septembre à Noël 1942 (in French). Brussels: Les Éditions Lumen. OCLC 44668497.

== Sources ==
- Gubin, Éliane (2006). Dictionnaire des femmes belges: XIXe et XXe siècles (in French). Racine, Brussels: Lannoo Uitgeverij. ISBN 978-2-87386-434-7. OCLC 71362867.
- Kesaris, Paul. L, ed. (1979). The Rote Kapelle: the CIA's history of Soviet intelligence and espionage networks in Western Europe, 1936-1945 (pdf). Washington DC: University Publications of America. ISBN 978-0-89093-203-2.
