= Johann Wenzel =

German Communist and GRU agent (1902–1969)

- Johann Wenzel after his arrest
- Born: 9 March 1902; Nidowo, Nowy Staw
- Died: 2 February 1969 (aged 66); Berlin
- Citizenship: German
- Occupation: Wireless Telegraphy technician
- Known for: Being part of the Red Orchestra ("Rote Kapelle")
- Espionage activity
- Allegiance: Soviet Main Intelligence Directorate
- Service branch: GRU
- Service years: 1933-1945
- Codename: Professor; Charles; Bergmann; Hans; Hermann

Johann Wenzel (9 March 1902, Nidowo, Nowy Staw – 2 February 1969, Berlin) was a German Communist, highly professional GRU agent and radio operator of the espionage group that was later called the Red Orchestra by the Abwehr in Belgium and the Netherlands. His aliases were Professor, Charles, Bergmann, Hans, and Hermann. Wenzel was most notable as the person who exposed the Red Orchestra after his transmissions were discovered by the Funkabwehr, later leading to his capture by the Gestapo on 29–30 June 1942.

== Life ==
Wenzel came from a working-class family and was the son of a farmer. After leaving school, Wenzel worked as a locksmith apprentice in a coal mining company in the Ruhr and in a company of the Krupp Group in Essen. Wenzel was a communist in his youth and joined the Young Communist League of Germany in 1921 and joined the Communist Party of Germany (KPD) in 1925. He would work for the AM-Apparat of the KPD for the next ten years.

== Career ==
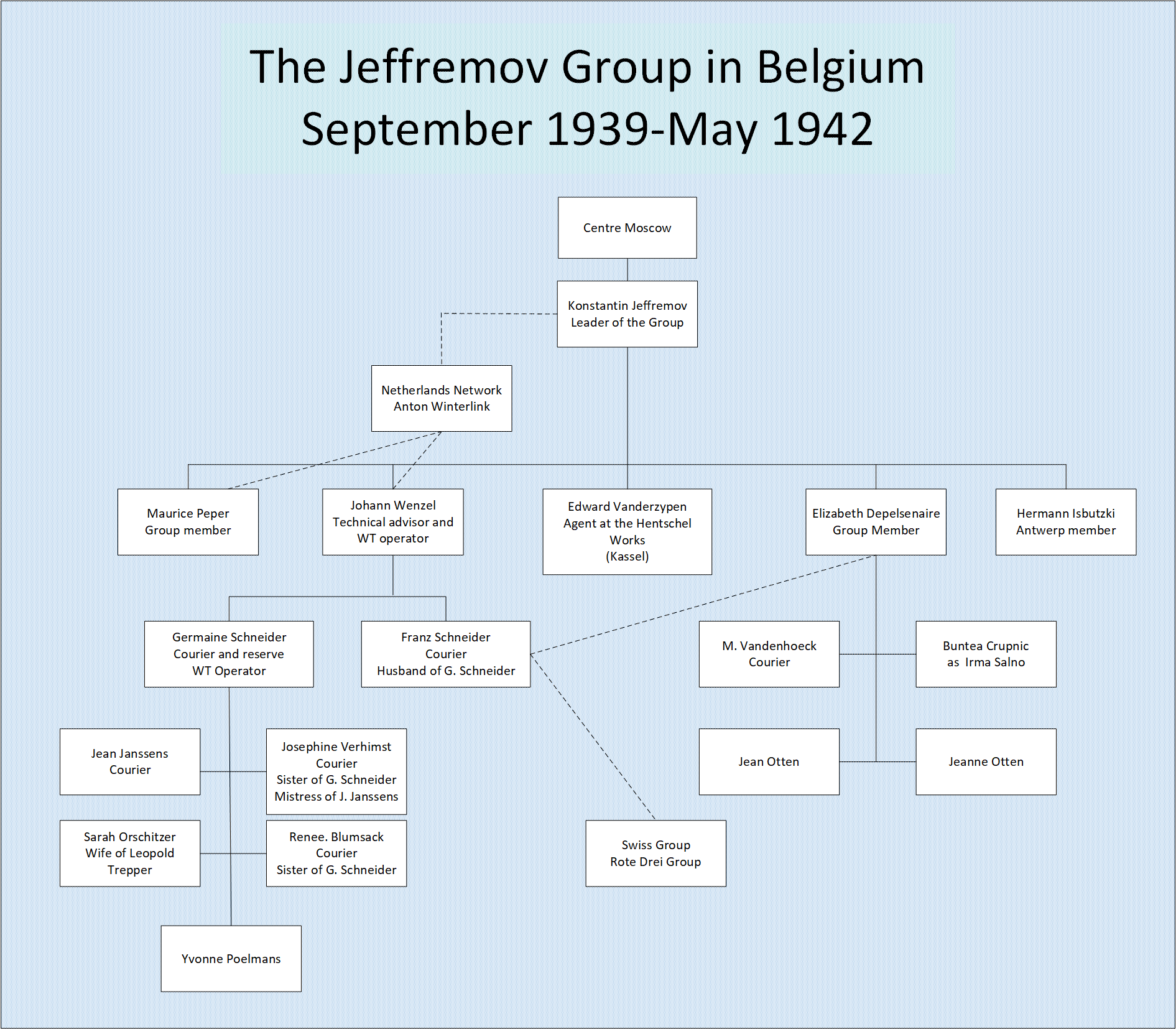
Organisational diagram of the first Jeffremov Group

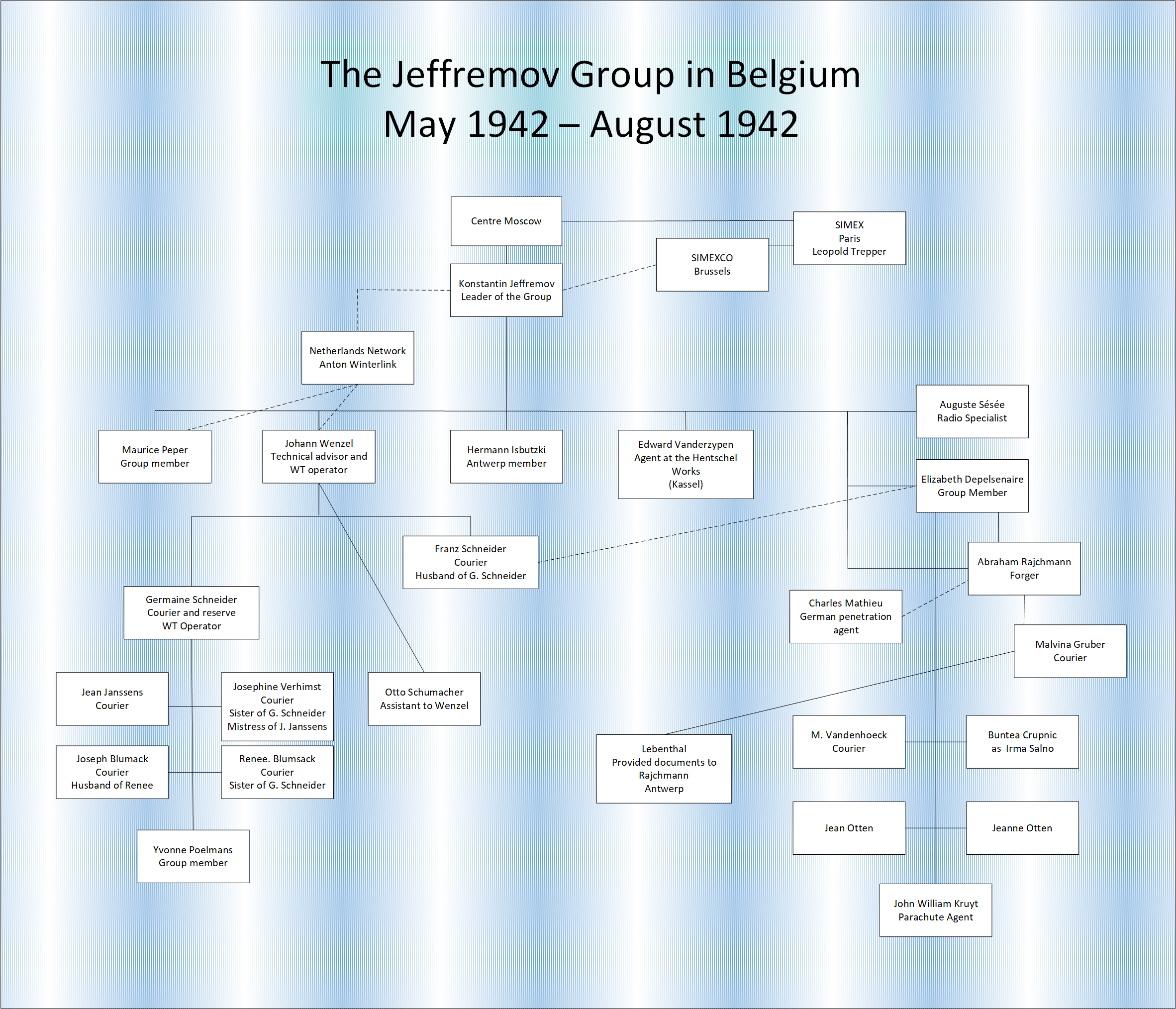
Organisational diagram of the second Jeffremov Group

In 1929–30, Wenzel travelled to Moscow to take a military-political course as a Kursant, under the pseudonym Horst, that was run by the AM Apparat of the Communist International (Comintern). When Wenzel returned, he worked as a full-time instructor for communist military issues in Hamburg, Bremen, Essen, Düsseldorf, and Cologne using the pseudonym Hermann, for the next several years. During this period Wenzel was likely already in touch with the veteran Soviet intelligence officer Henry Robinson, who would later become an assistant to Leopold Trepper and technical director of the AM Apparat for Western Europe in 1940 and director of an espionage network in France.

In the summer of 1933, Wenzel travelled to the Netherlands with Theodor Bottländer, an official of the AM Apparat department of the Central Committee of the KPD, to obtain information on Marinus van der Lubbe, who was in Berlin and who was among those accused of setting the Reichstag fire. After the fire, the German Communist Party was banned, forcing Wenzel to flee. In 1935, Wenzel was ordered to report to the 4th Division of the General Staff of the Red Army, the Intelligence Directorate, to be intensively trained as a wireless telegraphy (WT) operator in preparation to be a technical advisor in Western Europe.

On 29 January 1936, he arrived in Belgium under the guise of a student of mechanics and enrolled at a technical school. There he met the Soviet intelligence officers Leopold Trepper, who controlled seven espionage networks in Western Europe, and Anatoly Gurevich, his assistant, who controlled one those networks. His express mission was to use his new training to set up a radio network in Belgium but the Belgian authorities refused him permission to remain. So, he moved to the Netherlands in late 1936 or early 1937 (sources vary), where he made contact with Daniël Goulooze, who was director of the Communist Party of the Netherlands (CPN) and who acted as the main liaison officer between the CPN and the Communist International in Moscow. With Goulooze, they discussed plans for the construction of a radio network in the Netherlands.

In early 1938, Wenzel illegally returned to Belgium and it is likely that he resided with Franz Schneider and his wife, Germaine. Schneider was a Swiss communist who had connections with Henry Robinson. In 1939, he became a technical advisor on WT procedures and codes to Anatoly Gurevich and trained a number of WT operators in the Low Countries. Wenzel was a technical advisor to Konstantin Jeffremov, who was a Soviet agent who ran a separate network in the Netherlands.

On 15 November 1939, the French police issued a report that stated Wenzel was working as a saboteur as a member of the Comintern-based Internationale der Seeleute und Hafenarbeiter (The Seamen's and Dockers' International), designed to spread communist propaganda amongst seamen.

From December 1940 to July 1942, Wenzel transmitted intelligence by WT to the Soviet Union. In November 1941, on orders from Anatoly Gurevich, Wenzel transmitted messages on information that Gurevich had received from Harro Schulze-Boysen in October 1941 in Berlin. In May 1942, following Mikhail Makarov's arrest, Wenzel was invited to re-establish a WT link to Moscow by Jeffremov, after Jeffremov took over Anatoly Gurevich's network, after he escaped to France. In May 1942, Wenzel commenced transmitting important traffic to the Soviet Union. In June 1942, following the capture of Hersch Sokol who was the WT operator for Leopold Trepper in Paris, Léon Grossvogel a Soviet intelligence officer who was Trepper's assistant, ordered Wenzel to become the WT operator for Trepper in France.

== Capture ==
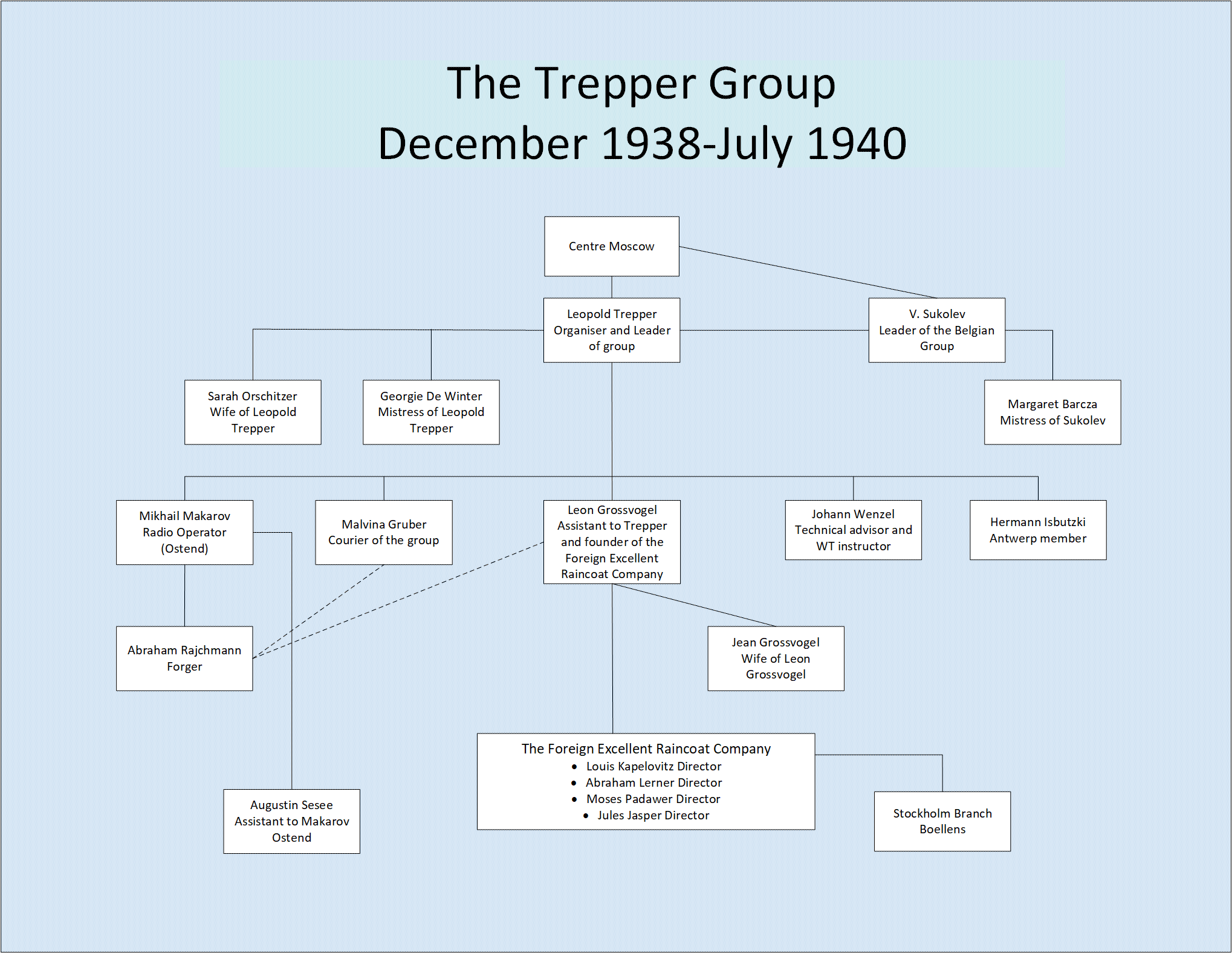
Diagram of the Trepper Group in Belgium

By using direction finding and radio intercept monitoring techniques, from the goniometric stations in Nuremberg, Augsburg and Brest that had formed a triangulation azimuth, the Funkabwehr were able to identify an illegal radio transmission that came from the home of Wenzel at his Brussels home at 12 Rue de Namur. It took several days to identify the correct location due to the layout of the building and the electric railway that ran through the neighbourhood, but on 29–30 June 1942, Captain Harry Piepe along with some men, including policemen and Luftwaffe personnel, sealed off the street in Laeken, in Brussels. When the Abwehr broke into the apartment in the tenement where Wenzel was located, the Abwehr surprised him and he took off over the rooftops, firing his pistol at the Germans as he tried to escape but he was eventually arrested on 30 June 1942.

During the search of the apartment, it was found that Wenzel had left a series of coded messages and two messages written in German that were waiting to be enciphered. These messages contained details of such startling content, the plans for Case Blue, that Piepe immediately drove to Berlin from Brussels and, after revealing his find and explaining its relevance, met with Wilhelm Canaris. Canaris arranged an immediate meeting with Wilhelm Keitel who was Chief of the Oberkommando der Wehrmacht.

Wenzel was taken to Saint-Gilles Prison in Brussels. Piepe informed Karl Giering, director of Gestapo in Brussels, and he forwarded a message to the Reich Security Main Office (RSHA) Section IV Subsection 2A, requesting any details regarding Wenzel, and they returned a number of card indexes that were found detailing Wenzel's early communist career and his name was identified in the RSHA Black Book as a wanted man.

Such was the urgency by the Germans to reveal the communist network that was associated with Wenzel that he was subject to brutal interrogation including torture that lasted six to eight weeks and he eventually confessed to everything including his cover-name, The Professor, due to him being a specialist in radio telephony and its technology. After his torture he was a broken man and he agreed to collaborate with the Germans in a Funkspiel operation using his own radio transmitter that began on 6 August 1942. The funkspiel operated code named "Weide", was controlled by Heinz Pannwitz of Sonderkommando Rote Kapelle at a house on Rue de l'Aurore in Brussels. The German funkspiel operation was largely a failure. In Belgium, Soviet intelligence was likely given an early warning when Germaine Schneider informed Trepper of the raid at 12 Rue de Namur in July 1942.

== Escape ==
Over several months, the Sonderkommando guards at Rue de l'Aurore became lulled into a false sense of security and either on the 17 or 18 November 1942, Wenzel managed to escape, when they failed to lock an outside door. Wenzel noticed this, fled and locked the door behind him and managed to get away.

He managed to survive in Belgium until allied liberation in October 1944. He made contact with the Soviet military mission in Paris and in January 1945 was sent to Moscow. There he was interrogated and sentenced by a Special Commission to five years forced labour. He was released in the Soviet Union in 1950. From 1955 he lived in the GDR where he worked as a radio broadcast technician. Wenzel died on 2 February 1969 in East Berlin.
