= Germaine Schneider =

Belgian courier for the Red Orchestra

- Born: 17 March 1903; Anderlecht, Belgium
- Died: 12 November 1945 (aged 42); Zürich, Switzerland
- Occupation: Courier
- Years active: 1936-1942
- Known for: Courier of Red Orchestra ("Rote Kapelle")

Germaine Schneider (17 March 1903 - 12 November 1945) was a Belgian communist and Communist International (Comintern) agent. During the latter half of the 1920s, Schneider worked predominantly for the Communist Party of Belgium. During the interwar period and early World War II, Schneider was a core member of a Soviet espionage group. She worked as a principal courier for the groups that were associated with the Comintern agent, Henry Robinson in the late 1930s in France and later the Soviet GRU officer, Konstantin Jeffremov in Belgium and the Low Countries, in the early 1940s. These groups were later identified by the Abwehr under the moniker the Red Orchestra. Schneider used the aliases Clais, Pauline, Odette, Papillon and Butterfly (Schmetterling) to disguise her identity.

== Life ==
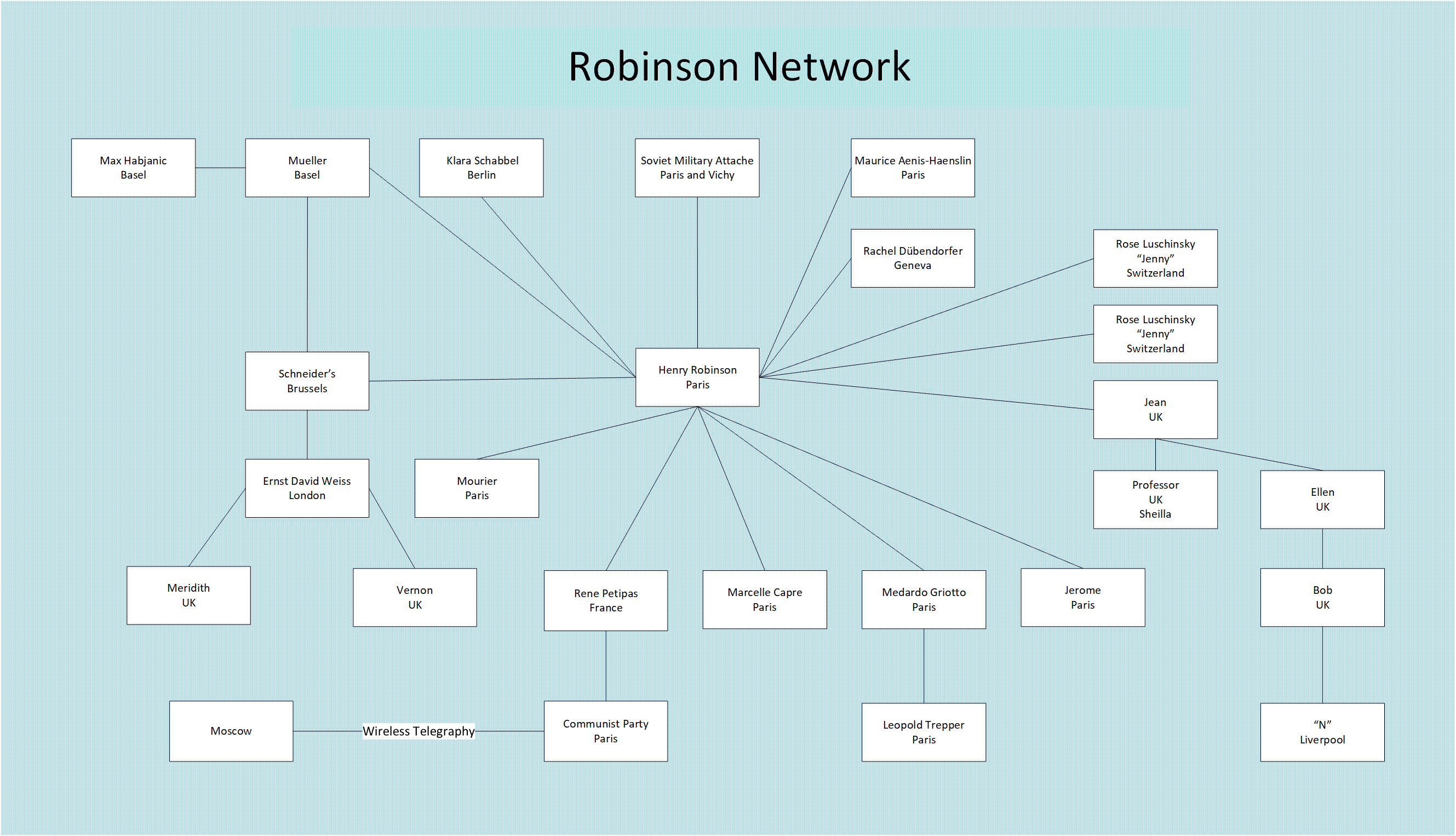
The Comintern espionage network in France that was run by Comitern agent Henry Robinson

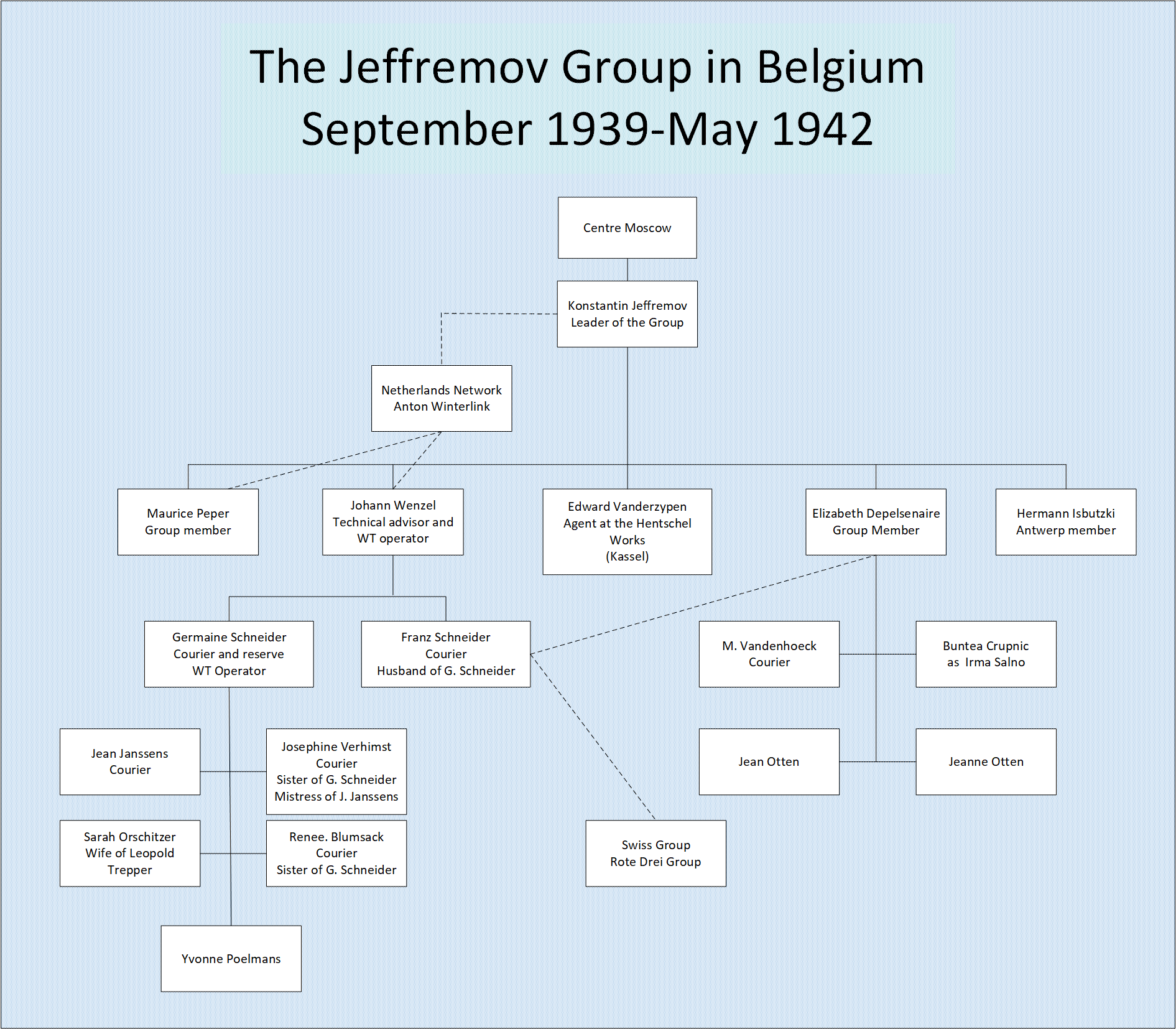
The organisational diagram of the Jeffremov espionage group in Brussels. Schneider was the principal courier for the group in Brussels, although she had no direct involvement with the group, working directly for Wenzel

Schneider had been living and working in Brussels since 1920. In January 1925, Germaine Schneider (née Clais) married Swiss national Franz Schneider. The couple had a long honeymoon in Switzerland before returning in Brussels two months later. That same year, Schneider was recruited into the Communist International (Comintern) organisation. Between 1925 and 1929, Schneider provided safehouse accommodation for travellers who were members of the Comintern. At the same time she worked for the Communist Party of Belgium. Schneider's apartment saw many communists come and go including Maurice Thorez and Jacques Duclos. In 1929, she was deported from Belgium as a communist agitator but made a clandestine return to the country after a short period. From 1929 to 1936, the Schneiders were politically inactive and lived a relatively quiet life in Brussels. In 1936, while the couple were living in Brussels, they were recruited as Soviet agents of the Red Army Intelligence (GRU) to work as couriers. The couple had an apartment at 47 Rue de la comtesse de Flandre in Brussels.

== Couriering ==
=== Robinson network ===
In the autumn of 1935, Harry II, an unidentified Soviet agent of the Red Army Intelligence took over control of Ernest Weiss, a Soviet agent resident in London, who was recruited in 1932 to run an espionage network in the United Kingdom. The German- born Weiss resided in London and applied to become a naturalised British citizen to disguise his activities. In November 1936, Harry II introduced Schneider to Ernest David Weiss in South Kensington, London. During that period from 1936 to 1939, Schneider visited Weiss at his home in South Kensington several more times as well as working as a courier in France, Netherlands, Switzerland, Germany. From 1939 to 1942, Germaine Schneider and her husband worked as a couriers for a Soviet espionage network that operated in the Low Countries that became known as the Red Orchestra. In early 1938, Johann Wenzel returned illegally to Belgium and it is likely that he resided with the couple. At the time, Wenzel trained Schneider as a wireless radio operator.

=== Jeffremov network ===
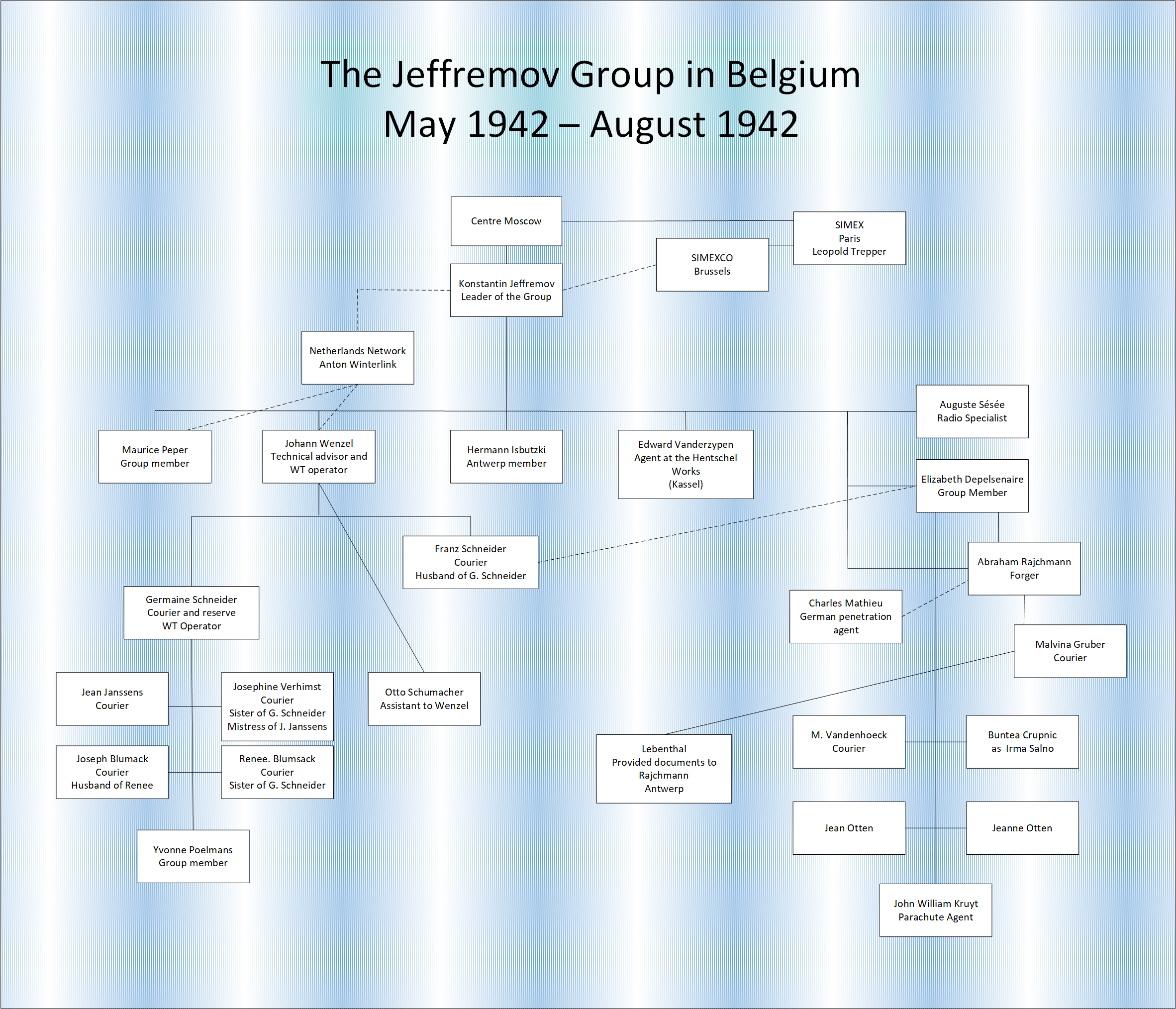
The organisational diagram of the second Jeffremov espionage group in Brussels. Schneider had direct involvement in the group

It is unknown who recruited Schneider into the Jeffremov network, but by September 1939, Schneider and her husband were working for Konstantin Jeffremov in Belgium as couriers. As well as working as an assistant to Léon Grossvogel, Schneider was the principal courier between the Belgium and French networks.

Schneider recruited a significant number of people into the Jeffremov network and managed those people as a sub-network within the Jeffremov network. These included her sisters Renee Blumsack, who was a courier between Paris and Brussels and Josephine Verhimst also a courier, as well as Renee's husband, Joseph Blumsack who was also a courier between Brussels and Paris Josephine's lover, Jean Janssens, was also a courier on the same route and Yvonne Poelmans, a gymnast and masseuse who was recruited for a minor role.

In May 1942, Leopold Trepper, who was technical director of Soviet Red Army Intelligence in western Europe, and Soviet agent Konstantin Jeffremov met in the couple's house in Brussels. At the meeting, Trepper placed Jeffremov in charge of running the espionage network in Belgium and the Low Countries that had been rebuilt. Schneider was to became a courier between Jeffremov in Brussels and Trepper in Paris.

== Arrest ==
In November 1942, Schneider was arrested while she was working for the Springer group in Lyon. She was betrayed by Jeffremov. On the 30 November 1942, her husband Franz Schneider was arrested and taken to Fort Breendonk prison, where he was tortured.Schneider was sent to a concentration camp and was liberated by the Red Army advance in May 1945. She was gravely ill when she left Ravensbrück concentration camp and was sent to a Swiss sanitarium in Zürich in October 1945. In April 1943, he husband was transferred to Germany and kept isolated in several prisons before being sent to Brandenburg-Görden Prison and kept in the same cell as Maurice Èmile Aenishanslin, a Swiss communist and commercial director who was an agent of the network run by Henry Robinson. He remained there until the end of war, when he was liberated by the advancing Soviet front in May 1945. He suffered lung disease in prison and recovered sufficiently well to join Germaine in Zurich in October 1945.

== Death ==
She died on 12 November 1945 of cancer. Her funeral was attended by Maurice Aenis-Hanslin.

== Bibliography ==
- Dallin, David (1955). Soviet espionage. Yale University Press. OCLC 989342115.
- Kochik, V. I︠A︡. (2004). Razvedchiki i rezidenty GRU : za predelami otchizny (in Russian). Moscow: I︠A︡uza. ISBN 9785878491662. OCLC 1171802295.

== Bibliography ==
- Bourgeois, Guillaume (2015). La Véritable Histoire de l'Orchestre rouge. Le Grand Jeu. Nouveau Monde. ISBN 9782369420675. OCLC 922305775.
- Coppi Jr., Hans (July 1996). Dietrich Bracher, Karl; Schwarz, Hans-Peter; Möller, Horst (eds.). "Die Rote Kapelle" [The Red Orchestra in the field of conflict and intelligence activity, The Trepper Report June 1943] (PDF). Quarterly Books for Contemporary History (in German). 44 (3). Munich: Institute of Contemporary History. ISSN 0042-5702. Archived from the original (PDF) on 18 May 2015.
- Dallin, David J (1955). Soviet Espionage. New Haven: Yale University Press.
- Kesaris, Paul. L, ed. (1979). The Rote Kapelle: the CIA's history of Soviet intelligence and espionage networks in Western Europe, 1936-1945 (pdf). Washington, D.C.: University Publications of America. ISBN 978-0-89093-203-2.
- Perrault, Gilles (1969). The Red Orchestra. New York: Schocken Books. ISBN 0805209522.
- Tarrant, V. E (1999). The Red Orchestra. London: Cassell. p. 42. ISBN 978-1-85409-216-8. OCLC 670121406.
- West, Nigel (2007). Historical dictionary of cold war counterintelligence. Historical dictionaries of intelligence and counterintelligence. Vol. 6. Lanham, Md.: Scarecrow Press. p. 369. ISBN 9780810864634. OCLC 263614927.
