= Gmina Nowy Staw =

Gmina Nowy Staw Nowy Staw Commune
- Gmina
- Flag Coat of arms
- Interactive map of Gmina Nowy Staw
- Coordinates (Nowy Staw): 54°8′8″N 19°0′48″E
- Country: Poland
- Voivodeship: Pomeranian
- County: Malbork
- Seat: Nowy Staw

Area
  - Total: 114.38 km^{2} (44.16 sq mi)

Population (2022)
  - Total: 6,858
  - Density: 59.96/km^{2} (155.3/sq mi)
- Website: https://nowystaw.pl/

Gmina Nowy Staw is an urban-rural gmina (administrative district) in Malbork County, Pomeranian Voivodeship, in northern Poland. Its seat is the town of Nowy Staw, which lies approximately 12 kilometres (7 mi) north of Malbork and 36 km (22 mi) south-east of the regional capital Gdańsk.

The gmina covers an area of 114.38 square kilometres (44.2 sq mi), and as of 2022 its total population is 6,858.

== Villages ==
In addition to the town of Nowy Staw, Gmina Nowy Staw contains the villages and settlements of Brzózki, Chlebówka, Dębina, Dybowo, Kącik, Krzewiny, Laski, Lipinka, Lubiszewo Drugie, Lubstowo, Martąg, Michałowo, Mirowo, Myszewo, Nidowo, Półmieście, Pręgowo Żuławskie, Stawiec, Świerki, Tralewo and Trępnowy.

== Neighbouring gminas ==
Gmina Nowy Staw is bordered by the gminas of Lichnowy, Malbork, Nowy Dwór Gdański, Ostaszewo and Stare Pole.
