= Dębina, Malbork County =

Dębina
- Village
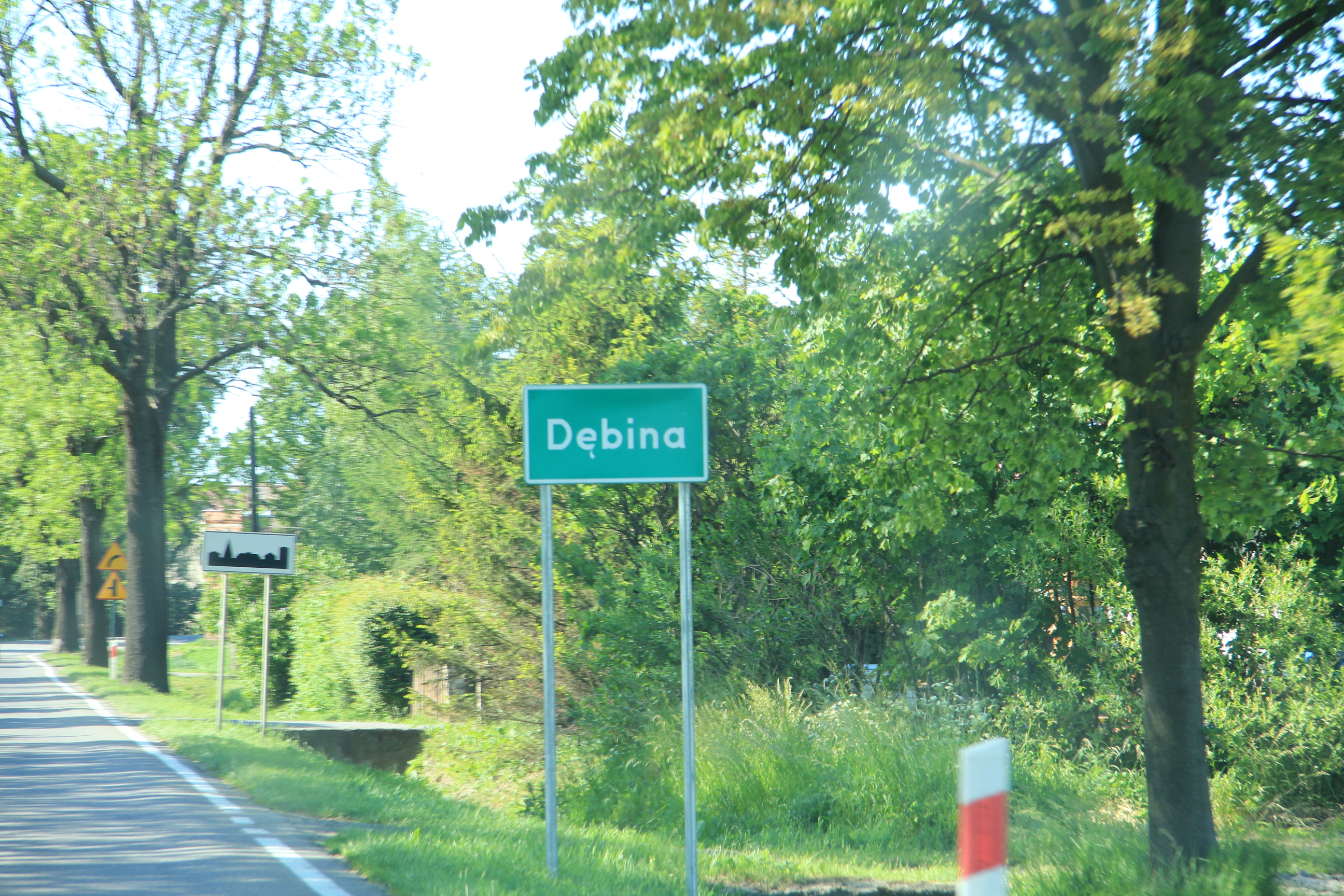

- Location within Poland
- Coordinates: 54°6′45″N 19°2′20″E
- Country: Poland
- Voivodeship: Pomeranian
- County: Malbork
- Gmina: Nowy Staw
- Population (2022): 388

Dębina [dɛmˈbina] is a village in the administrative district of Gmina Nowy Staw, within Malbork County, Pomeranian Voivodeship, in northern Poland.

Before 1772 the area was part of Kingdom of Poland, in 1772-1919 and 1939–1945 to Prussia and Germany, and in 1920–1939 to Free City of Danzig. In 1945 it returned to Poland. For the history of the region, see History of Pomerania.
