= Konstantin Jeffremov =

Soviet GRU officer, who was part of the Rote Kapelle

Konstantin Lukitsch Jeffremov
- Captain Konstantin Jeffremov
- Born: 15 May 1910
- Died: Unknown
- Occupations: Agent of GRU, Active espionage group leader
- Years active: 1936–1944
- Known for: Head of a Netherlands and later Belgian espionage group

Konstantin Lukitsch Jeffremov (born 15 May 1910), also known as Konstantin Yeffremov, (Note: In Perrault, Jeffremov is known by the spelling Yefremov) was a Soviet GRU military intelligence officer, known as a scout in Soviet intelligence parlance, with the rank of captain. Jeffremov was an expert in chemical warfare. Jeffremov used the aliases Pascal, Bordo, Eric Jernstroem to disguise his identity in messages. He had been working for Soviet intelligence since 1936. Jeffremov has been labeled an anti-Semite, as he expressed resentment towards being subordinate to the Jews who dominated the GRU. He was the organizer of a Soviet espionage network in the Netherlands and the Low Countries In 1942 this led him taking over and running a number of networks in Belgium and the Netherlands that had been damaged in the months prior after several members were arrested by the Abwehr. These networks were later given the moniker the Red Orchestra ("Rote Kapelle") by the Abwehr. Jeffremov was arrested in July 1942 and agreed to work for the Abwehr in a Funkspiel operation after being tortured.

Jeffremov's ultimate fate is not known, but according to one source he escaped at the end of 1944 and eventually reached Moscow by way of Switzerland.

== Life ==
After completing seven years of schooling including attending the Labor Faculty in Tula, he attended the Moscow Chemical Technical College. In 1937, he finished the academy with the title of military technician with the rank of First lieutenant (Russian:Starshy leytenant) and started to work for the GRU, dealing primarily with military technical reconnaissance. Jeffremov, a relative newcomer to a professional career in espionage, had been subject to accelerated training.

== Belgium ==
In September, 1939 Jeffremov using the alias Eric Jernstroem, arrived in Brussels from Zürich via Budapest and Odessa, travelling as a Finnish student. Upon arrival, Jeffremov enrolled in the École Polytechnique to study chemistry, assuming the veneer of an ordinary student. During the late interwar period, he was likely employed in the collection of technical information relating to chemical and chemistry, heavy industry.

=== Jeffremov network ===
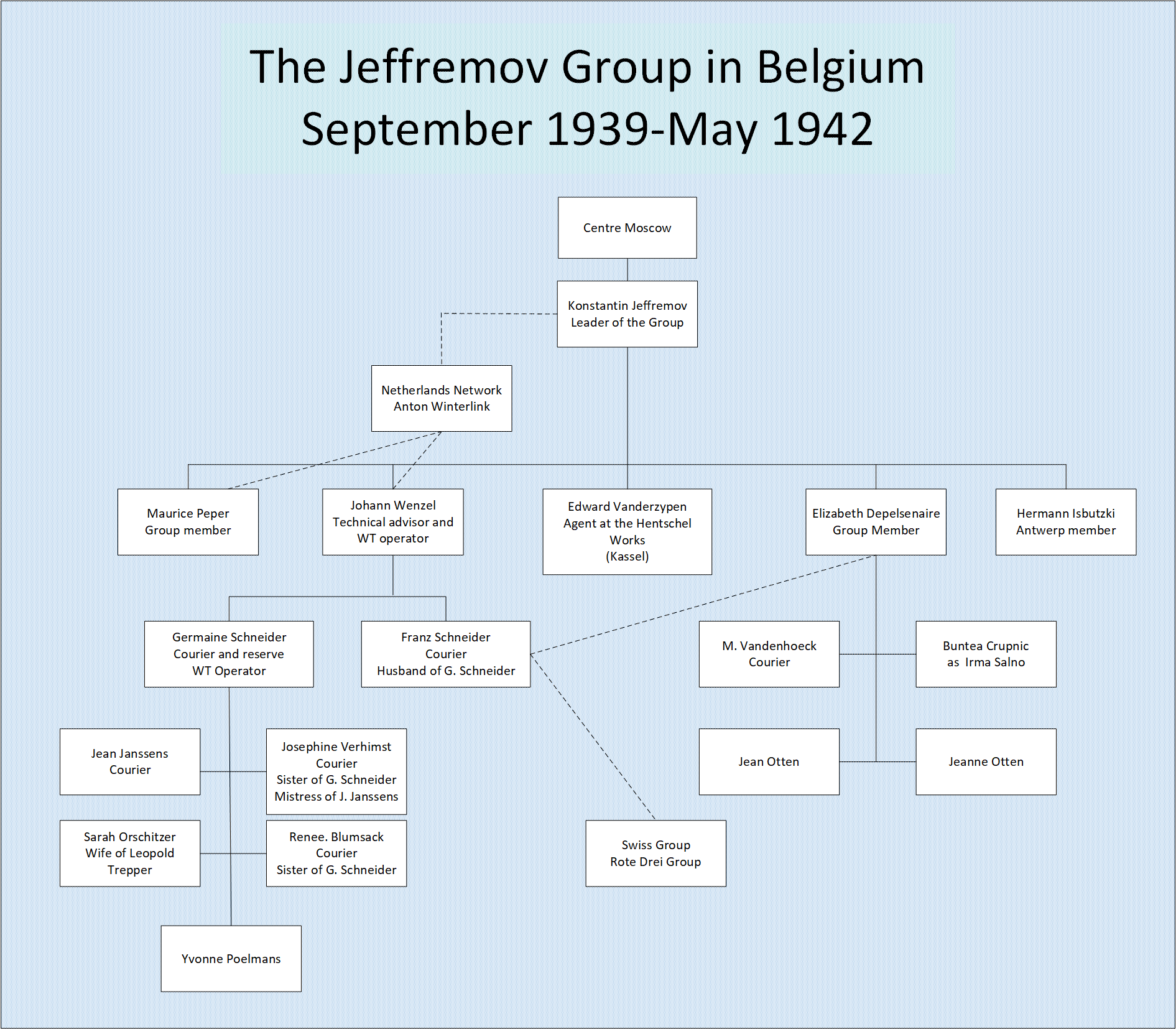
Organisational diagram of the first Jeffremov Group

With the outbreak of World War II, Jeffremov was retasked with organising variously disparate groups in the Low Countries, into an effective espionage network that could collect political, economic and military intelligence. Jeffremov immediately made contact with Johann Wenzel, a German communist and radio specialist based in the Netherlands, who would act in the role of technical advisor to Jeffremov. Wenzel had recruited the Communist Party member Anton Winterink at the beginning of 1939 and later, also recruited Dan Goulooze, the director of the Dutch Communist party. Both would become part of Jeffremov's network in Brussels. In 1938, Winterink had established a network that was part of the Rote Hilfe, that would be used by Jeffremov, in the capacity as his supervisor. Winterink was trained as a radio operator by Wenzel.

In 1939, he recruited the married couple, Belgian Germaine Schneider and Swiss Franz Schneider. The couple were Comintern agents who has been working for Soviet intelligence since late 1936. Prior to that, they had been running safe-houses for persecuted Comintern officials. Germaine Schneider was the most important of the two, working as a courier that involved extensive travel across Europe and was Henry Robinson's contact to Soviet agents in Great Britain. While she worked from Jeffremov, she couriered between Brussels and Paris. Franz Schneider was also a courier, but only to Switzerland.

Although Jeffremov initially used the Dutch Communist Party to transmit intelligence to Soviet intelligence, by December 1940, Wenzel had established a connection to Moscow. Jeffremov ran his espionage network independently of other Soviet networks in the Netherlands in the period of 1940 and 1941.

=== Anatoly Gurevich network ===
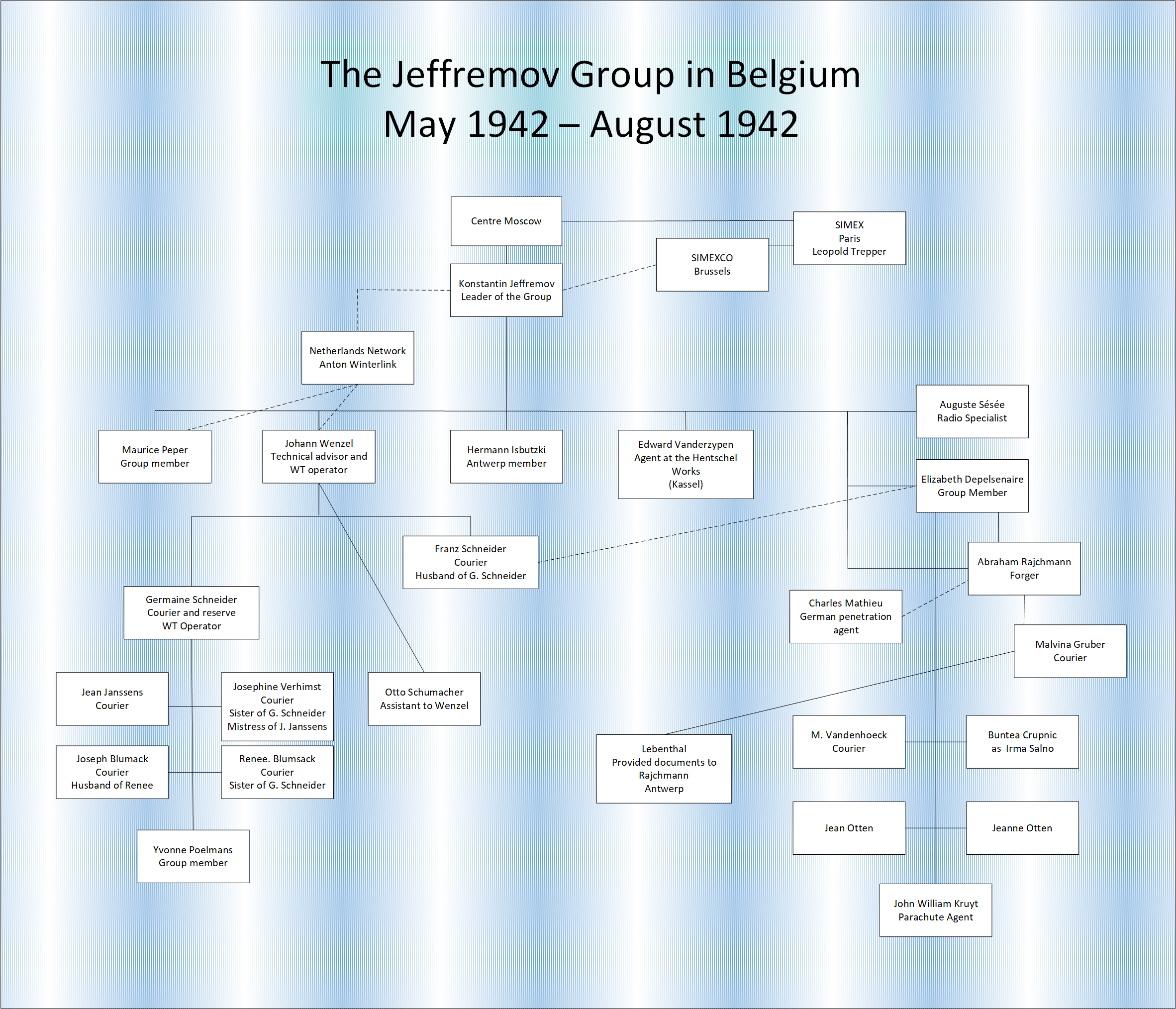
Organisational diagram of the second Jeffremov Group

In May 1942, during an arranged clandestine meeting, Jeffremov met with Leopold Trepper in the house of the Schneider's in Brussels. Trepper was the technical director of a Soviet Red Army Intelligence in western Europe and had been instructed by Soviet intelligence to employ Jeffremov as the new leader of the Belgian network, in the absence of Anatoly Gurevich who had run the network in Belgium from July 1940 to December 1941. It had been severely damaged, when several members of the group had been arrested by the Abwehr on the 12 December 1941. The people were arrested during a raid on a house on Rue des Atrébates, that was being used a transmitting safe-house. Gurevich himself had hid in the house of Nazarin Drailly, a member of the group, to evade the Abwehr, before leaving for Paris. Trepper gave Jeffremov 100,000 Belgian francs for daily expenses and made several recommendations on how the network should be run, which Jeffremov accepted. Trepper had ordered all radio transmission to cease for at least six months and to rely on couriers only to deliver intelligence. Probably the most important aspect of Jeffremov's work was the continued transmission of the intelligence provided by Harro Schulze-Boysen, that was couriered from Germany. According to Daniël Goulooze, Jeffremov was in communication with Soviet Intelligence via Wenzel since 1940 but on an infrequent basis.

=== Operations ===
Jeffremov was frequently admonished by Soviet intelligence for his lack of activity and slow production of quality intelligence. However, Germaine Schneider was considered a proficient courier.

== Unmasking ==
In June 1942, Trepper ordered Jeffremov to begin transmitting as six months had passed since the raid on Rue des Atrébates on 12 December 1941. This was a fatal mistake, however, as on 30 June 1942, the Funkabwehr identified a house at 12 Rue de Namur, Brussels as the location of a radio transmitter and arrested Wenzel. Wenzel was subjected to enhanced interrogation and eventually confessed. He agreed to collaborate and exposed several members of the Belgian network.

Letters found on Wenzel implicated Germaine Schneider as his mistress. Schneider was arrested, but managed to convince the Gestapo that she was romantically evolved with Wenzel and knew nothing about his work. This convinced the Gestapo and she was released.

Schneider immediately went to meet Trepper in Paris to warn him. Trepper in turn warned Jeffremov and instructed him to create a new identity. Jeffremov turned to Abraham Rajchmann, the groups forger, who unknown to Jeffremov, was in close contact with an Chief Inspector of the Belgian State Police Charles Mathieu. Mathieu was a penetration agent, known in Germany as a V-Mann, short for Vertrauens-mann. (German:V-Mann, plural V-Leute). They were generally prisoners who agreed to work as undercover agents on pain of death, should they have refused. Mathieu reported the request to Abwehr officer Harry Piepe. Rajchmann informed Mathieu of Jeffremov's request for new identity papers and the time and the place of the meeting.

== Arrest ==
Jeffremov was arrested on 22 July 1942 in Brussels, while attempting to obtain the forged identity papers for himself and taken to Fort Breendonk. Jeffremov was to be tortured but agreed to cooperate and gave up several important members of the espionage network in Belgium and the Netherlands. In the Netherlands, he exposed Anton Winterink, who was arrested on 26 July 1942 by Abwehr officer, Piepe. Winterink was taken to Brussels, where he confessed after two weeks of enhanced interrogation. Through Jeffremov, contact was made with Germaine Schneider. When Schneider was arrested, she managed to convince the Sonderkommando Rote Kapelle that she not involved in intelligence work and was released. When released, Schneider decided to contact Leopold Trepper, the technical director of a Soviet Red Army Intelligence in western Europe to inform him of the arrests. Trepper advised Schneider to sever all contact with Jeffremov and move to a hideout in Lyons. Giering instead focused on Germaine Schneider's husband Franz Schneider.

In November 1942, Franz Schneider was interrogated by Karl Giering of the Sonderkommando, but as he was not part of the network he wasn't arrested and managed to inform Trepper that Jeffremov had been arrested.

Jeffremov (sources vary) also exposed Simexco to the Abwehr. Simexco was a cover company that was used by the Trepper network in Belgium to provide funding for operations and to disguise its activities. At the same time, Jeffremov exposed the name and the existence of the Trepper espionage network in France.

== Funkspiel ==
Eventually Jeffremov began to work for the Sonderkommando Rote Kapelle in a Funkspiel operation that had the name of Buche-Pascal. The operation did not achieve success due to the warning delivered by Germaine Schneider to Trepper.

== Bibliography ==
When searching on Jeffremov, in the original Russian use, Ефремов, Константин Лукич

- Coppi Jr., Hans (July 1996). Dietrich Bracher, Karl; Schwarz, Hans-Peter; Möller, Horst (eds.). "Die Rote Kapelle" [The Red Orchestra in the field of conflict and intelligence activity, The Trepper Report June 1943] (PDF). Quarterly Books for Contemporary History (in German). 44 (3). Munich: Institute of Contemporary History. ISSN 0042-5702. Archived from the original (PDF) on 18 May 2015.
- Poltorak, S. N. (2003). Razvedchik "Kent" (in Russian). Saint Petersburg: Neva. ISBN 9785765421888. OCLC 644931461.
- Schafranek, Hans (2004). Tuchel, Johannes (ed.). Krieg im Äther : Widerstand und Spionage im Zweiten Weltkrieg (in German) (1st ed.). Vienna: Picus. ISBN 3-854-52470-6.
- Trepper, Leopold (1990). Bol'shai︠a︡ igra : gody uchenii︠a︡ "Krasnyĭ orkestr" vozvrashchenie, vospominanii︠a︡ sovetskogo razvedchika (in Russian). Moskva: Izd-vo politicheskoĭ lit-ry. p. 260. ISBN 9785250008297. OCLC 938541726.
