= Tralewo, Malbork County =

Tralewo
- Village
- Location within Poland
- Coordinates: 54°6′19″N 19°0′7″E
- Country: Poland
- Voivodeship: Pomeranian
- County: Malbork
- Gmina: Nowy Staw
- Population (2022): 248

Tralewo [traˈlɛvɔ] is a village in the administrative district of Gmina Nowy Staw, within Malbork County, Pomeranian Voivodeship, in northern Poland.

Before 1772 the area was part of Kingdom of Poland, 1772-1919 Prussia and Germany, 1920-1939 Free City of Danzig, September 1939 - February 1945 Nazi Germany. In 1945 it returned to Poland. For the history of the region, see History of Pomerania.
