= Krzewiny, Pomeranian Voivodeship =

Krzewiny
- Settlement
- Location within Poland
- Coordinates: 54°8′13″N 19°13′7″E
- Country: Poland
- Voivodeship: Pomeranian
- County: Malbork
- Gmina: Nowy Staw

Krzewiny [kʂɛˈvinɨ] is a settlement in the administrative district of Gmina Nowy Staw, within Malbork County, Pomeranian Voivodeship, in northern Poland.

Before 1772 the area was part of Kingdom of Poland, in 1772–1919 and 1939–1945 of Prussia and Germany, and in 1920–1939 of Free City of Danzig. In 1945 returned to Poland. For the history of the region, see History of Pomerania.
