= Martąg =

- Village
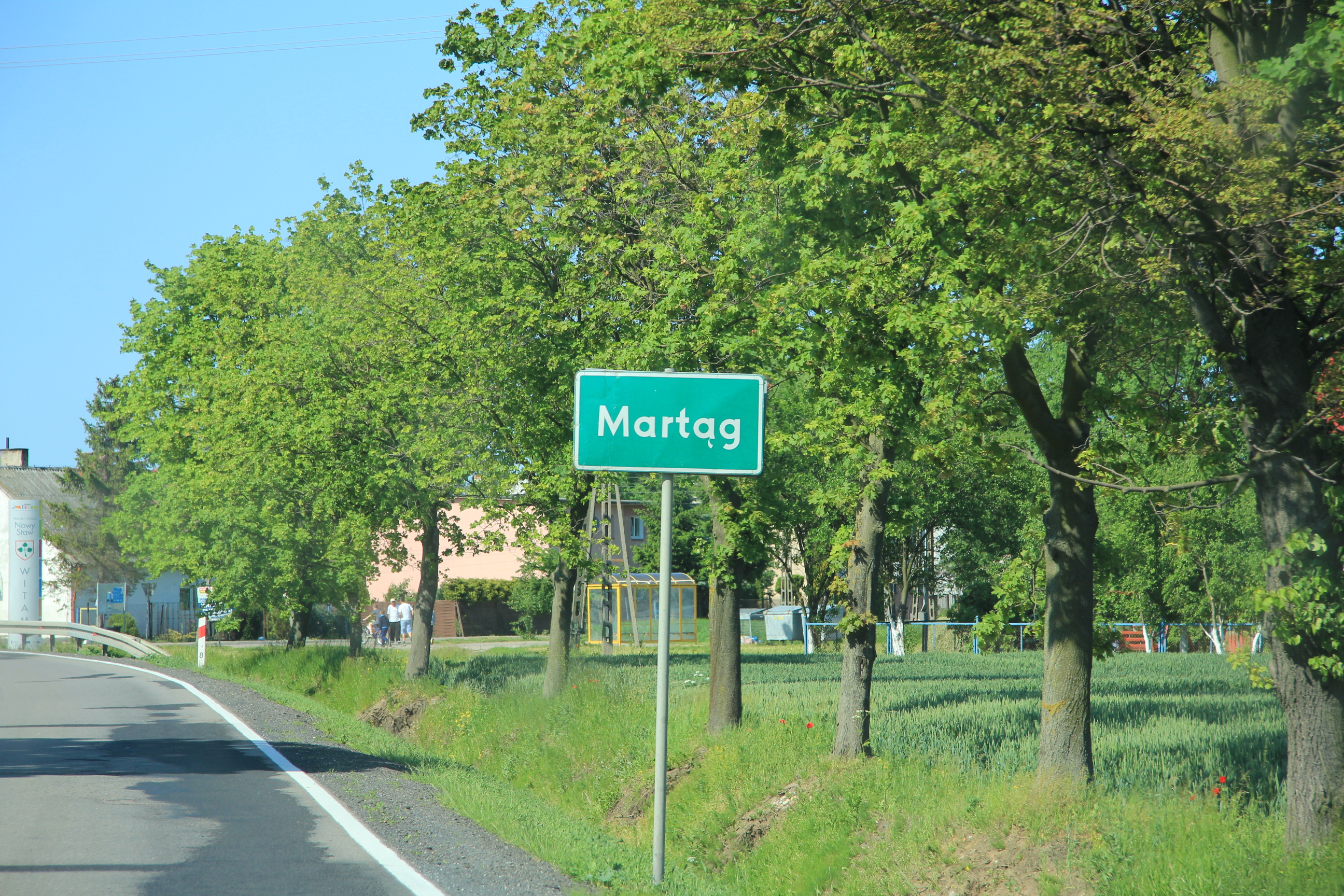

- Location within Poland
- Coordinates: 54°5′57″N 19°3′13″E
- Country: Poland
- Voivodeship: Pomeranian
- County: Malbork
- Gmina: Nowy Staw
- Population (2022): 174

Martąg [ˈmartɔnk] is a village in the administrative district of Gmina Nowy Staw, within Malbork County, Pomeranian Voivodeship, in northern Poland.

For the history of the region, see History of Pomerania.
