= Kącik, Pomeranian Voivodeship =

Kącik
- Village
- Location within Poland
- Coordinates: 54°9′50″N 18°56′49″E
- Country: Poland
- Voivodeship: Pomeranian
- County: Malbork
- Gmina: Nowy Staw
- Population (2022): 42

Kącik [ˈkɔnt͡ɕik] is a village in the administrative district of Gmina Nowy Staw, within Malbork County, Pomeranian Voivodeship, in northern Poland.

Before 1772 the area was part of Kingdom of Poland, in 1772-1919 and 1939-1945 to Prussia and Germany, and in 1920-1939 to Free City of Danzig. In 1945 it returned to Poland. For the history of the region, see History of Pomerania.
