= Lubstowo =

- Village
- Location within Poland
- Coordinates: 54°7′56″N 19°11′52″E
- Country: Poland
- Voivodeship: Pomeranian
- County: Malbork
- Gmina: Nowy Staw
- Population (2022): 197

Lubstowo [lupsˈtɔvɔ] is a village in the administrative district of Gmina Nowy Staw, within Malbork County, Pomeranian Voivodeship, in northern Poland.

For the history of the region, see History of Pomerania.
