= Lubiszewo Drugie =

- Village
- Location within Poland
- Coordinates: 54°9′14″N 19°0′56″E
- Country: Poland
- Voivodeship: Pomeranian
- County: Malbork
- Gmina: Nowy Staw
- Population: 70

Lubiszewo Drugie [lubiˈʂɛvɔ ˈdruɡʲɛ] is a village in the administrative district of Gmina Nowy Staw, within Malbork County, Pomeranian Voivodeship, in northern Poland.

For the history of the region, see History of Pomerania.
