= Pręgowo Żuławskie =

- Village
- Location within Poland
- Coordinates: 54°9′26″N 18°55′45″E
- Country: Poland
- Voivodeship: Pomeranian
- County: Malbork
- Gmina: Nowy Staw

Pręgowo Żuławskie [prɛnˈɡɔvɔ ʐuˈwafskʲɛ] is a village in the administrative district of Gmina Nowy Staw, within Malbork County, Pomeranian Voivodeship, in northern Poland.

For the history of the region, see History of Pomerania.
