= Michałowo, Malbork County =

Michałowo
- Village
- Location within Poland
- Coordinates: 54°7′17″N 19°13′10″E
- Country: Poland
- Voivodeship: Pomeranian
- County: Malbork
- Gmina: Nowy Staw
- Population: 10

Michałowo [mixaˈwɔvɔ] is a village in the administrative district of Gmina Nowy Staw, within Malbork County, Pomeranian Voivodeship, in northern Poland.

For the history of the region, see History of Pomerania.
