= Trępnowy =

- Village
- Location within Poland
- Coordinates: 54°7′20″N 18°58′41″E
- Country: Poland
- Voivodeship: Pomeranian
- County: Malbork
- Gmina: Nowy Staw
- Population (2022): 217

Trępnowy [trɛmpˈnɔvɨ] is a village in the administrative district of Gmina Nowy Staw, within Malbork County, Pomeranian Voivodeship, in northern Poland.
