= Stawiec, Malbork County =

Stawiec
- Settlement
- Location within Poland
- Coordinates: 54°8′29″N 18°58′54″E
- Country: Poland
- Voivodeship: Pomeranian
- County: Malbork
- Gmina: Nowy Staw
- Population (2022): 71

Stawiec [ˈstavjɛt͡s] is a settlement in the administrative district of Gmina Nowy Staw, within Malbork County, Pomeranian Voivodeship, in northern Poland.

For the history of the region, see History of Pomerania.
