= Brzózki, Pomeranian Voivodeship =

Brzózki
- Village
- Location within Poland
- Coordinates: 54°10′23″N 19°1′9″E
- Country: Poland
- Voivodeship: Pomeranian
- County: Malbork
- Gmina: Nowy Staw
- Population (2022): 128

Brzózki [ˈbʐuski] is a village in the administrative district of Gmina Nowy Staw, within Malbork County, Pomeranian Voivodeship, in northern Poland.

Before 1772 the area was part of Kingdom of Poland, 1772-1919 and 1939-1945 to Prussia and Germany. For the history of the region, see History of Pomerania.
