= Maurice Èmile Aenishanslin =

Maurice Aenishanslin
- Born: Maurice Emile Aenishanslin; 20 September 1893; Saint-Denis, Seine-Saint-Denis, France
- Died: 20 October 1968 (aged 75); Coppet, La Chapelle, France
- Occupations: Engineer, then commercial director, Comintern agent, courier
- Years active: 1936-1942
- Known for: Agent of Red Orchestra ("Rote Kapelle")

Maurice Emile Aenishanslin (20 September 1893 – 19 October 1968) was a French engineer who became a committed French communist, a member of the Communist Party of Switzerland and later a member of the Communist International (Comintern). Aenishanslin later became a commercial director of the Paris-based company Unipectine-France, the branch office of a food preservation company that was based in Zurich called Unipectine. During World War II, Aenishanslin main business was interposed with clandestine work as a courier for the Paris-based Soviet espionage network run by Comintern agent Henry Robinson. Aenishanslin survived the war and was still active as a communist.

== Life ==
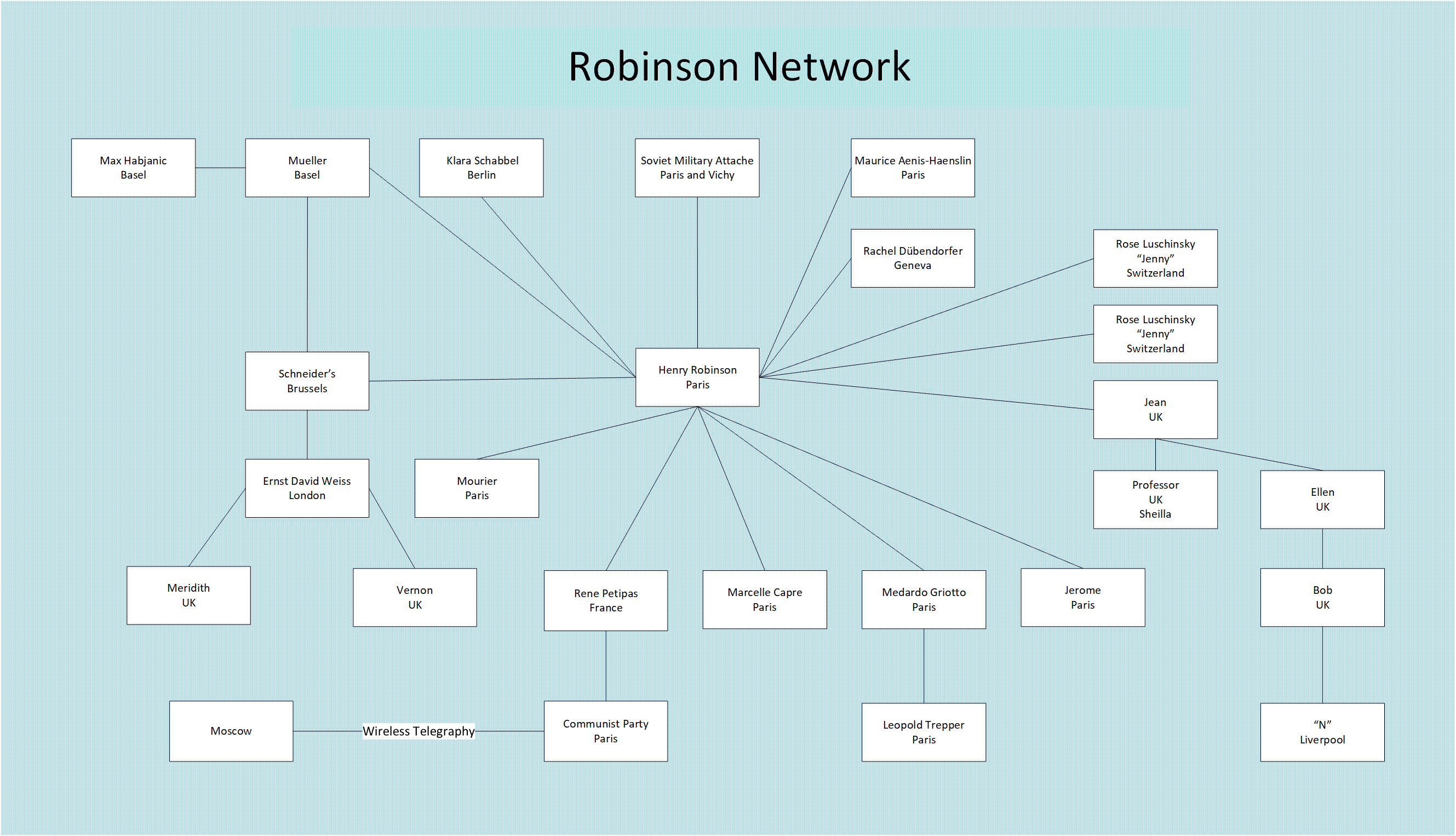
The espionage network of Henry Robinson that ran from 1937 to September 1941 before it was taken over by Leopold Trepper

Aenishanslin was a French national who was born into a Swiss family from Basel in Switzerland who were Calvinists. He became a communist after the Russian Revolution in 1917.

On the 3 July 1926 Aenishanslin married Gabrielle Lucile Schneider in Blois in Loir-et-Cher. In 1933, the couple separated. Just prior to the start of the war, Aenishanslin married his secretary, Edwige Couchon, a communist activist, who worked as an accountant for the communist daily newspaper Ce soir and as an activist in the 5th arrondissement of Paris. The couple lived in an apartment at 25, Rue Raynouard in Passy in the 16th arrondissement.

== Career ==
Aenishanslin became a member of the Communist Party of Switzerland and rose to become an official of the central committee and an important member of the Communist International (Comintern). He trained as an engineer and was gradually attracted to the food industry. He became the general agent of a large Swiss company that manufactured distillation equipment and this in turn led him to an interest in the use of apple pectin for use as a food preservation. This led to a company being established in Bahnhofstrasse, Zurich with the name of Unipectine in the early 1930's, with capital supplied from Karl Hofmaier who at the time was treasurer of the Swiss Communist Party.

=== Paris ===
Aenishanslin used a luxury apartment at 31 Rue Amsterdam in Paris, that the group used as a safehouse for the group. Belgian Communist Henry Robinson who ran an espionage network based in Paris and was Aenishanslin controller, had a meeting place and an office there.

On the instruction of the Comintern, Aenishanslin along with Hans Schauwecker, established a branch office of the company, known as Unipectine France that was founded in Paris on 24 February 1933 at Rue Cognacq-Jay. The business was used as a cover company, to distribute monies from the Comintern into Western Europe espionage groups. Its full name was "Societe a Responsabilite Limiteee UNIPECTINE" and operated initially as "Societe Silvana". The business moved locations several times and by September 1939 was located at 25 Rue Raynouard in Paris. The company originally dealt in the manufacturing and selling of wooden poles but on 26 November 1936, it changed to the manufacturing company, selling of vegetable products, particularly Pectin. In reality a front. On 28 February 1942, the company, after changing its location several times, was renamed "Unipectine".

Between 1940 and 1942, Aenishanslin couriered for a network run by Leopold Trepper, moving funds between Robinson in Paris and Red Three agent Rachel Dübendorfer in Switzerland.

== Arrest ==
On the 12 April 1943, Aenishanslin was arrested along with his mistress Edwige Couchon, by the Gestapo. In October 1943, Aenishanslin was sent to Fresnes Prison. On the 4 November 1943, he was sentenced to death by a military tribunal. However, the Swiss authorities intervened and his sentence was commuted to 10 years in a military prison. Edwige Couchon, who was arrested at the same time was deported to Germany and sent to Ravensbrück concentration camp. Couchon fell ill and was sent to the gas chambers, where he was gassed to death on 9 March 1945.

== After the war ==
Aenishanslin survived the war. In 1945 he attended the funeral of Germaine Schneider in Zurich. In 1946-1947, he was still associated with Unipectine in Paris. In 1948, Aenishanslin along with Hans Schauwecker and Karl Hofmaier, were engaged in exporting books by the communist publisher, "Mundus Verlag" to the Allied occupation zone of Germany. On 26 October 1957, Aenishanslin remarried Geneviève Gambaro in Savigny-sur-Orge (Seine et Oise) and often went to the hamlet of Coppet in La Chapelle, Edwige Couchon's native village, where he died.

On 29 September 1961 Aenishanslin changed his surname. It was initially Aenishänslin but was frenchified to Aenishanslin by judgment of TGI Seine.

== Unipectine ==
The Unipectine company is still in existence and is still located on Avenue de l'Opéra in Paris.

== Sources ==
- Kesaris, Paul. L, ed. (1979). The Rote Kapelle: the CIA's history of Soviet intelligence and espionage networks in Western Europe, 1936-1945 (pdf). Washington DC: University Publications of America. ISBN 978-0-89093-203-2.
