= Nidowo =

- Village
- Location within Poland
- Coordinates: 54°8′28″N 19°7′41″E
- Country: Poland
- Voivodeship: Pomeranian
- County: Malbork
- Gmina: Nowy Staw
- Population (2022): 46

Nidowo [niˈdɔvɔ] is a village in the administrative district of Gmina Nowy Staw, within Malbork County, Pomeranian Voivodeship, in northern Poland.

The village was recorded to be located, according to royal data in the second half of the 16th century, within the territories of the Malbork Voivodeship

For the history of the region, see History of Pomerania.
