= Éliane Gubin =

Belgian historian (born 1942)

Éliane Gubin Professor Emerita
- Born: Éliane Grosjean; 1942 (age 83–84); Brussels, Belgium
- Occupations: Historian; researcher; professor

Academic background
- Education: Université libre de Bruxelles (ULB)

Academic work
- Discipline: History
- Sub-discipline: History of women and feminism; history of contemporary Belgium
- Institutions: ULB

Éliane Gubin (born in 1942) is a Belgian historian, researcher and professor of political and social history, specializing in the history of women and feminism. In the late 1980s, she initiated the introduction of women's history at the Université libre de Bruxelles (ULB), where she is professor emerita. She also teaches the history of contemporary Belgium and specializes in social history and political history of the nineteenth century and the first half of the twentieth century, including a re-reading of the World War I. Since 1995, she has been co-director of the Centre d'archives pour l'histoire des femmes.

== Early life and education ==
Eliane Grosjean was born in Brussels in 1942. Her father was a practicing Catholic and worked at the customs office; her mother was a teacher. Eliane did her secondary studies at the Lycée Émile Jacqmain, then studied history at the ULB, submitting her thesis in 1964, "Le Théâtre de la Monnaie et le Théâtre Flamand à Bruxelles de 1860 à 1880". Her doctoral thesis was on the Flemish Movement in Brussels.

== Career and research ==
Gubin was a professor of contemporary history at the Faculty of Philosophy and Letters of the ULB until 2007. During these years, she worked within the university and was at the origin of several initiatives. In 1988, she obtained a grant and went to Quebec where she discovered the vitality of the feminist movement. Upon her return to Belgium in 1989, she formed a research group on women's history made up of historians, demographers, sociologists and political scientists, thus introducing this field to the university. This interdisciplinary group is called Groupe Interdisciplinaire d'Etudes sur les Femmes (GIEF).

In 1992, with GIEF, Gubin founded the journal Sextant whose issues have been published approximately once a year since 1993. The subjects covered are women's history, motherhood and feminist activism. The journal's editorial board is composed of teachers from different faculties, including Hilde Heynen, architecture researcher. Sextant is not the first feminist journal in Belgium, but it is the first academic journal to deal with women's and gender issues. Since 2008, Sextant has been published by Éditions de l'Université de Bruxelles and has been subsidized since 2014 by the National Fund for Scientific Research.

In 1995, Gubin founded and co-directs Carhif, the Centre d'Archives et de Recherches pour l'Histoire des Femmes. The center publishes articles and holds archives related to Belgian women's movements. It also co-organizes exhibitions and colloquia. Gubin remains a member of the board of directors.

The study of women's history at the ULB is not always well received, but Gubin's academic recognition allows her to get past the criticism. She has worked to promote the teaching of the role of women in secondary and university education and published a manual for teachers in 2013, with Claudine Marissal, Catherine Jacques and Anne Morelli, Femmes et hommes dans l'histoire. Un passé commun (Antiquité et Moyen Âge).

In addition to numerous articles and books published throughout her career, Gubin has participated in and directed two major projects. The first is the publication in 2006 of the Dictionnaire des Femmes belges - XIXe et XXe siècles (Dictionary of Belgian Women - 19th and 20th centuries) containing more than 400 biographies. The second, co-directed with the Belgian historian Catherine Jacques, is the l'Encyclopédie d'histoire des Femmes en Belgique - XIXe et XXe siècles (Encyclopedia of Women's History in Belgium - 19th and 20th centuries). She is also the author, in 2007, of the biography of Éliane Vogel-Polsky, a Belgian lawyer and feminist who was an important figure of feminism at the ULB.

== Awards and honours ==
- Honorary Professor, ULB, since 2007.
- Royal Academy of Science, Letters and Fine Arts of Belgium, Class of Letters, Arthur Merghelynck Foundation, awarded a prize in 2005 to the editorial committee of the Dictionnaire des femmes belges : XIXe et XXe siècles.
- In 2011, she was one of the hundred exceptional women honored on the occasion of the hundredth anniversary of International Women's Day.

== Selected works ==
- With Anne-Laure Briatte, Françoise Thébaud, L'Europe, une chance pour les femmes ? Le genre de la construction européenne, Paris, Éditions de la Sorbonne, 2019, ISBN 979-10-351-0286-9
- With Catherine Jacques (ed.), Claudine Marissal (collab.), Encyclopédie d'histoire des femmes: Belgique, XIXe-XXe siècles, Brussels, Racine, 2018, ISBN 978-2-39025-052-4
- With Henk De Smaele, Femmes & hommes en guerre, 1914-1918 : gender@war, Brussels, Renaissance du Livre, 2015, ISBN 978-2-507-05332-1
- With Jean Stengers (author), Ginette Kurgan-Van Hentenryk (scientific editor), José Gotovitch (scientific editor), Une guerre pour l'honneur: la Belgique en 14–18, Brussels, Racine, 2014
- With Claudine Marissal, Catherine Jacques, Anne Morelli, Femmes et hommes dans l'histoire: un passé commun (Antiquité et Moyen Âge), Brussels, Labor, 2013 ISBN 978-2-87441-330-8
- With Jean-Pierre Nandrin and Pierre Van den Dungen, La Nouvelle histoire de Belgique, La Belgique libérale et bourgeoise, 1846–1878, Brussels, Le Cri, 2011, ISBN 978-2-87106-543-2
- Choisir l'histoire des femmes, Brussels, Université libre de Bruxelles, 2007, ISBN 978-2-8004-1395-2
- With Catherine Jacques, Géraldine Reymenants and Julie Wuytens, Éliane Vogel-Polsky : une femme de conviction, Brussels, Institut pour l'égalité des femmes et des hommes, 2007
- With Catherine Jacques (scientific editor), Valérie Piette (scientific editor), Jacques Puissant (scientific editor), Marie-Sylvie Dupont-Bouchat (collab.), Jean-Pierre Nandrin (collab.), Dictionnaire des femmes belges : XIXe et XXe siècles, Brussels, Racine, 2006, ISBN 978-2-87386-434-7
- With Jean-Pierre Nandrin (ed.), Emmanuel Gerard (ed.), Els Witte (ed.), Histoire de la Chambre des représentants de Belgique, 1830–2002, Brussels, Chambre des représentants, 2003
- With Serge Jaumain, Jean Puissant (scientific ed.), Éléments d'histoire de la Belgique (1830-1997), Brussels, Presses Universitaires de Bruxelles, 2001
- With Miet Smet, Leen Van Molle, Ria Christens, Katleen De Ridder, Ingrid Hansen, Femmes et politique en Belgique, Brussels, Racine, 1998, ISBN 978-2-87386-132-2
- With Ilse Gesquière, Catherine Jacques, Claudine Marissal, Miet Smet, Leen Van Molle, Parcours singuliers : portraits de dix élues en 1921, Brussels: Cabinet of the Federal Minister for Employment and Labor and Equal Opportunity Policy, 1994, ISBN 978-90-02-19878-6
- With Miet Smet, Els Flour, Catherine Jacques, Claudine Marissal, Leen Van Molle, Répertoire des sources pour l'histoire des femmes en Belgique, Brussels, Ministry of Employment and Labor, 1994, 2 vols.
- Bruxelles au XIXe siècle : cerceau d'un flamingantisme démocratique : 1840-1873, Brussels, Crédit communal, 1979
