= Henry Robinson (spy) =

Belgian Communist and later intelligence agent

- Henry Robinson after his arrest.
- Born: 8 May 1897; Brussels, Belgium
- Died: 1944 (aged 46–47); Berlin, Nazi Germany
- Citizenship: Belgian
- Occupations: Section leader, communist agitator
- Known for: Being part of the Red Orchestra ("Rote Kapelle")
- Espionage activity
- Allegiance: Communist International, GRU
- Service branch: AM Apparat
- Service years: 1930-1942
- Codename: Andre; Lucien; Leo; Giocomo

Henry Robinson (8 May 1897 – 1944), sometimes known as Henri Robinson or Henri Baumann was a Belgian Communist and later intelligence agent of the Soviet Communist International (Comintern) and later the GRU. His real name was Arnold Schnee. Robinson was a leading member of the Red Orchestra, a Soviet espionage group based in Paris. Robinson used a number of code names (Andre, Lucien, Leo, Giocomo) and aliases (Otto Wehrli, Albert Gottlieb Bucher, Alfred Merian, Harry Leon, Alfree Duyen, Harry Merian).

== Life ==
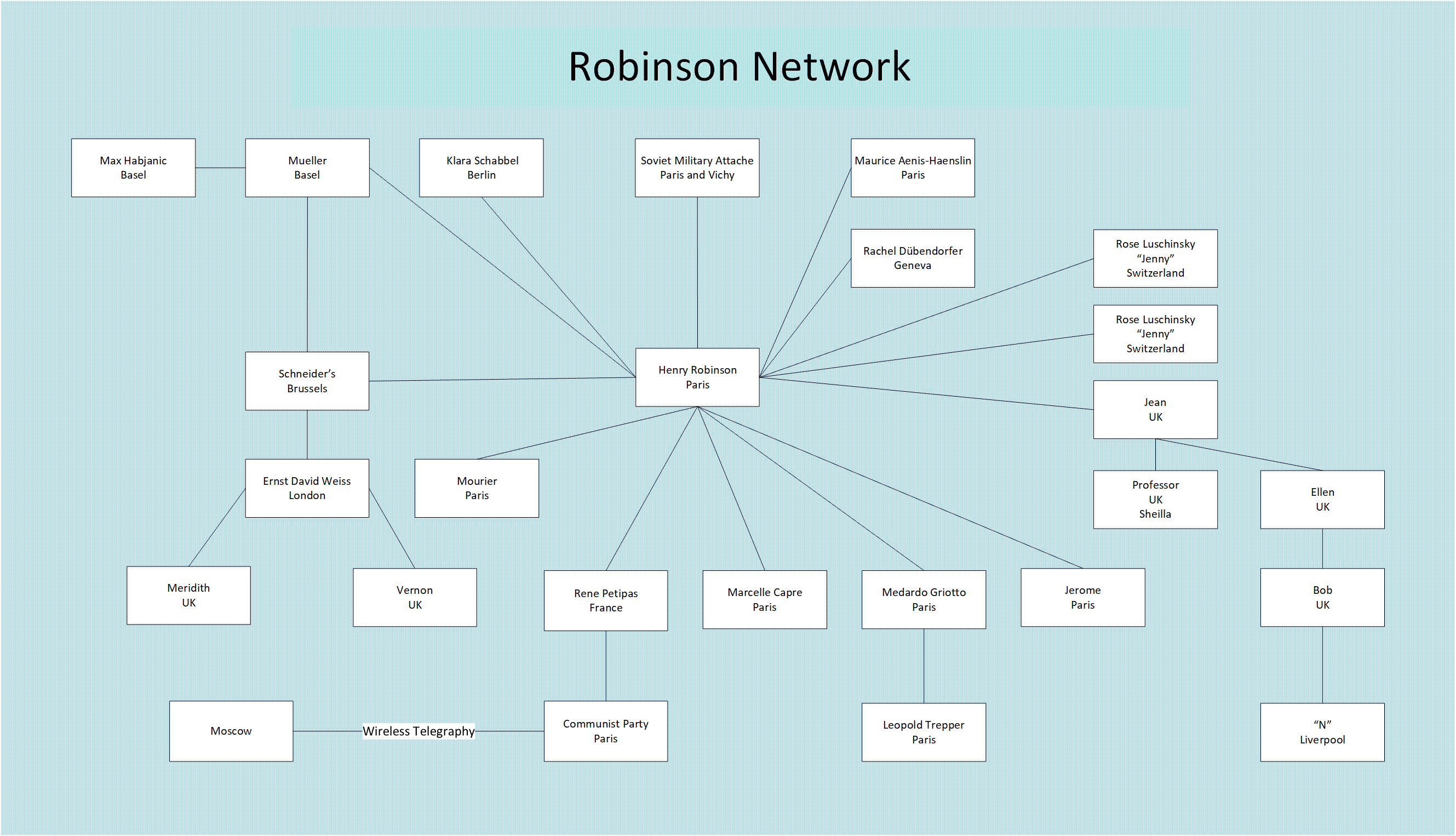
The espionage network of Henry Robinson that ran from 1937 to September 1941 before it was taken over by Leopold Trepper

Born in Brussels, Robinson grew up in Saint-Gilles, Belgium and was the child of wealthy Lithuanian merchant David Robinson, born in Vilna Governorate and Polish mother Anna Cerhannovsky, who was born in Warsaw. The couples original surname had been Rabinsohn. They had been a stateless and had visited Great Britain where they changed their surname to the Robinsons to be more accepted. The family couldn't settle there and had to move to Belgium before finally settling in Germany where they bought false papers to provide a veneer of legality. However, in 1914 they were discovered and interned. In 1917 the family were released. They subsequently moved to Switzerland and then to Évian-les-Bains in Eastern France where they received French citizenship.

During World War I, Robinson studied law at the University of Zurich. (Note: Sources vary. Kesaris reports it was the University of Geneva he studied at, while Bourgeois states it was the Heidelberg University.) He learned to speak English, French, Russian, German and Italian.

In 1919, he abandoned his studies to travel to Berlin to assist Rosa Luxemburg during the Spartacist uprising. Robinson was associated with German communist Willi Münzenberg and Swiss communist Jules Humbert-Droz who had created the Young Communist League of Germany (KJVD). In 1920, Robinson became a member of the French Communist Party (PCF) and a member of the Communist Party of Germany (KPD). In the same year he met and married the German communist and KPD member Clara Schabbel, and together the couple had a son, Leo, who was born in 1922. (Note: Sources vary. Kesaris reports that the sons name was Victor.)

== Comintern ==
In 1920, the KJVD created the Young Communist International (KIM), the youth wing of Communist International (Comintern). In 1921 at the behest of the KPD and under the auspices of the KIM, he made several visits to the Soviet Union. In 1923, Robinson was sent to Germany where he was in charge of the Antimilitarist Apparatus or AM Apparat (Intelligence organisation) of the German Communist Party for military and political work in the Rhineland and was Political Director of KIM in the Ruhr district of Germany. He was responsible for the mobilisation against the occupation of the Rhine and Ruhr area by French troops. This led to a French court sentencing him to 10 years in prison In Absentia. In 1924, Robinson under a pseudonym, Harry together with PCF member Henri Lozeray they cooperated in publishing L'I.C.J. en luttle contre l'occupation de la Ruhr et la guerre ( The I.C.J. fights against the occupation of the Ruhr and the war). Written in Moscow by V. Vouïovitch in the French language with a preface by Grigoriy Zinoviev, director of Comintern, the document details the propaganda work the KIM conducted in the Ruhr region.

Between 1924 and 1928, Robinson was director of the AM-Apparat of the KPD for Central and Eastern Europe which involved extensive travel between Germany, France and Low Countries. Between 1928 and 1930, Robinson assisted General Honoré Muraille, Chief of Soviet espionage in France. (Note: General Honoré Muraille, who lived under the pseudonym Henri Albaret in Basel was a former companion of Lenin who built a large and successful GRU network in France from 1927 that relied on support and intelligence from some 3,000 workers from the Rabkor network, that were controlled through L'Humanité.)

From about 1930, both Robinson and his wife worked for the intelligence service of the Comintern (OMS), which later merged with the Red Army's GRU intelligence service, and the Young Communist International.

== GRU ==
In 1933, Robinson was recruited into Soviet Red Army intelligence by Oscar Stigga on the orders of Yan Karlovich Berzin. He became the chief of BB-Apparat of the KPD (Note: The BB Apparat, Operation Reporting Apparatus, known in Germany as Betriebs-berichterstattung, was a highly secretive organisation within the KPD responsible for conducting industrial espionage.) in France, reporting to the 4th Directorate of Red Army intelligence. Robinson, now working under the pseudonym "Harry" conducted espionage operations to collect military intelligence in Germany, France and the UK.

From December 1935, Robinson became the deputy to the resident in Germany Oscar Stigga. In 1936, Robinson moved to Paris, where he supplied intelligence to the Soviet Military attaché at the Soviet embassy. While he was there, he was in contact with Maria Josefovna Poliakova and Rachel Dübendorfer in Geneva, Switzerland where he liaised between groups in France, Switzerland and the Great Britain.

In November 1937, Robinson became the main resident for Switzerland, France, and Great Britain when Stigga returned to the Soviet Union. Schabbel maintained links to Berlin and, through the Soviet commercial agency there, provided communications to Moscow until June 1941.

During the period he was in Paris, another agent, who was not identified was running his own espionage network in France and Great Britain. British intelligence gave the unknown agent the moniker HARRY II. HARRY II was responsible for an agent in Great Britain, known as Ernest David Weiss who had been recruited in 1932. In 1937, the unknown agent Harry II handed his espionage network in Great Britain over to Robinson.

From 1940, Robinson had been promoted to head of the AM Apparat for Western Europe. Robinson ran an espionage network, known as group Harry, whose remit was to collect intelligence from French military and political groups, from within the Deuxième Bureau and within Vichy intelligence, from the Central Committee of the French Communist Party, from Gaullist groups and from UK groups.

== Network ==
After the Ruhr incident, Robinson built a vast espionage network that spanned the whole of Europe. He relied on a small trusted band of professional agents, essentially activists, who worked in positions that involved travel, e.g. salesman, business representatives, railway workers. His network included Andre Labarthe, Maurice Èmile Aenishanslin, Basile Maximovitch, Ernest David Weiss, Hans Lubschinsky, Heinz Erwin Kallmann and Rachel Dübendorfer. Amongst his informants were politicians, journalists, scientists and employees of government departments including senior officers of the French military command.

Robinson worked undercover at Beffort and Colin engravers, located at 11 Passage Saint-Pierre-Amelot in the 11th arrondissement of Paris. The workshops there were an ideal place to exchange and transmit correspondence. For that Robinson made extensive use of microphotography. Robinsons network was built on two lines of communication. The first network was headquartered in Basel that connected Switzerland to the Netherlands via Germany and Belgium. The second network had communication points in Marseille and Nice that covered all of Southern Europe through Italy and as far as Bulgaria.

== Trepper ==
In September 1941, Robinson met with Soviet Red Army Intelligence agent, Leopold Trepper. Robinson had been ordered to subordinate his espionage network to Trepper.

There was an intense dislike between the two men due to Robinson being forced to hand over his network to Trepper when he arrived in France, even though Robinson was senior to Trepper. The Comintern organisation had lost prestige with Stalin who suspected it of deviating from Communist norms and Robinson was suspected of being an agent of the Deuxième Bureau and who was subsequently in ideological conflict with the aims of Soviet intelligence. This changeover had been facilitated in a meeting organised by General Ivan Susloparov. The group provided Trepper with intelligence on General Henri Giraud, the Dieppe Raid, coverage of Allied bombings in France and planning for Operation Torch.

== Arrest ==
On 20 December 1942 Robinson was arrested in Paris by the Sonderkommando Rote Kapelle. According to British records, the RSHA had become aware of Robinson from information obtained from Leopold Trepper, whom they had previously arrested. According to Horst Kopkow of Reich Security Main Office AMT IV A2, Robinson was held in custody in France. When the Sonderkommando arrested Clara Schabbel they discovered that their son was in the Wehrmacht. The Gestapo brought Leo Schabbel, who had been wounded in the Eastern Front together with his father and threatened his life but Robinson refused to talk. Robinson was then repeatedly tortured, before being brought to the Moabit detention centre in Germany to stand trial by General Judge of the Luftwaffe Manfred Roeder at the same time as Harro Schulze-Boysen.

At the time of his arrest, four false passports were found in the possession of Robinson, as well as the Robinson papers.

== Robinson papers ==
The Robinson papers were over 800 papers contained in briefcases, that were found underneath the floorboards of a hotel room that Robinson had regularly used. The originals had been lost but photostats had survived and these were sent by Abwehr IIF in France to Abwehrstelle Belgium, where they were captured during the British advance. In 1966, British intelligence comment:

the Robinson papers, apart from [Ernest David] Weiss, did not give any positive lead to spies in the UK. They do, indicate that Robinson played an important part in running Russian operations in the UK in the 1930s and it seems...

Many of the code names in the documents have never been identified.

== Citations ==
=== Bibliography ===
- Bourgeois, Guillaume (1995). Les Kominterniens II (in French). Vol. II. Paris: L'Age d'homme. ISBN 9782825105887. OCLC 489619257.
- Bourgeois, Guillaume (24 September 2015). La véritable histoire de l'orchestre rouge [The True Story of the Red Orchestra] (in French). Paris: Nouveau Monde Editions. ISBN 978-2-36942-069-9.
- Coppi, Hans (1996). "Die "Rote Kapelle" im Spannungsfeld von Widerstand und nachrichtendienstlicher Tätigkeit. Der Trepper-Report vom Juni 1943" [The Red Orchestra in the field of resistance and intelligence activity. The Trepper Report of June 1943] (PDF). Vierteljahrshefte für Zeitgeschichte. 44 (3): 431–458.
- Lazitch, Branko; Drachkovitch, Milorad M. (1986). Biographical Dictionary of the Comintern. Stanford: Hoover Press, Stanford University. ISBN 978-0-8179-8403-8.
- Kesaris, Paul. L, ed. (1979). The Rote Kapelle: the CIA's history of Soviet intelligence and espionage networks in Western Europe, 1936–1945. Washington DC: University Publications of America. ISBN 978-0-89093-203-2.
- Kochik, Valery Yakovlevich (22 December 2006). "Арнольд Шнеэ, он же Анри Робинсон" [Arnold Schnee, aka Henri Robinson] (in Russian). Moscow: Konstantin Remchukov. Nezavisimaya Gazeta.
- Kluth, Hans (1959). Die KPD in der Bundesrepublik: Ihre Politische Tätigkeit und Organisation 1945 - 1956 [The KPD in the Federal Republic: Its Political Activity and Organization 1945 - 1956] (in German). Wiesbaden: VS Verlag fur Sozialwissenschaften GmbH. ISBN 9783322962393.
- Lübbe, Peter (1978). Kommunismus und Sozialdemokratie: eien Streitschrift [Communism and Social Democracy: A Polemic] (in German). Berlin, Bonn: J.H.W.Dietz Nachf. ISBN 3-8012-1113-4.
- Perrault, Gilles (1969). The Red Orchestra. New York: Schocken Books. p. 190. ISBN 0805209522.
- Schafranek, Hans; Tuchel, Johannes (2004). Krieg im Äther. Widerstand und Spionage im Zweiten Weltkrieg [War in the ether. Resistance and espionage during World War II.]. Vienna: Picus. ISBN 3-85452-470-6.
- Whaley, Barton (September 1969). "SOVIET CLANDESTINE COMMUNICATION NETS Notes for a History of the Structures of the Intelligence Services of the USSR" (PDF). Defense Technical Information Center. Cambridge, Massachusetts: Center for International Studies, Massachusetts Institute of Technology.
- Baudoin, Julien (2020). "Documents du Mouvement Ouvrier 1883-1945" [Documents of the Labour Movement 1883-1945] (PDF). Bouquinerie Mouvements d’Idées. Toulouse. p. 32. Archived from the original on 11 March 2021.
- West, Nigel (2005). Mask: MI5's Penetration of the Communist Party of Great Britain. Hoboken: Taylor and Francis. ISBN 9780203696866.
- Wright, Peter; Greengrass, Paul (1988). Spycatcher : the candid autobiography of a senior intelligence officer. New York: Dell. ISBN 9780440201328.
