= Gesche =

Gesche is a feminine given name and a surname. People with the name include:

== Given name ==
- Gesche Gottfried (1785–1831), German serial killer.
- Gesche Joost (born 1974), German design researcher.
- Gesche Kindermann, biodiversity lecturer at National University of Ireland, Galway.
- Gesche Schünemann (born 1982), German Paralympic basketball player.
- Gesche Würfel (born 1976), German visual artist.

== Surname ==
- Adolphe Gesché (1928–2003), Belgian Catholic priest and theologian.
- Bruno Gesche (1905–1980), German military officer.
- Paul Gesche (1907–1944), German communist and resistance fighter.
