= Hochmuth =

Hochmuth is the surname of:

- Abraham Hochmuth (1816–1889), Hungarian rabbi
- Bruno Hochmuth (1911–1967), Major General in the United States Marine Corps
- Walter Hochmuth (1904–1979), German politician, resistance fighter and diplomat of East Germany

== See also ==
- Marie Hochmuth Nichols (1908–1978), influential rhetorical critic
- Kristina Richter (née Hochmuth, born 1946), Olympic handball player
- Phu Bai Combat Base (also known as Camp Hochmuth) is a former U.S. military base
- Katharina Jacob (1907–1989), wife of German communist politician Walter Hochmuth
- Ines Mandl (née Hochmuth, 1917–2016) was an Austrian-born American biochemist
