= Arthur Sodtke =

German Communist resistance fighter (1901–1944)

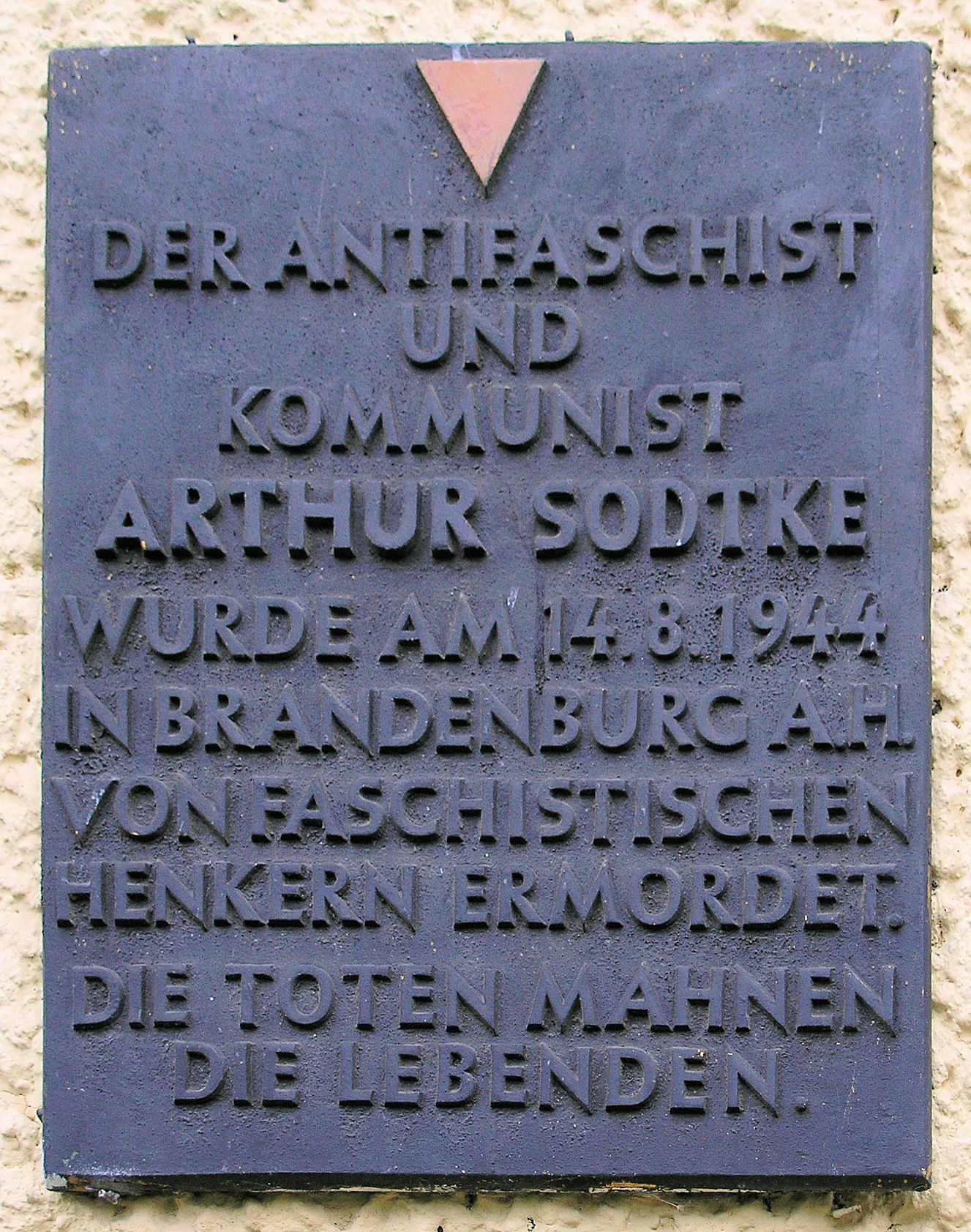
- Memorial plaque at Sodtke's former residence, Schönhauser Allee 39, Berlin
- Born: 25 December 1901; Inowrazlaw, Province of Posen, German Empire (Inowrocław, Poland)
- Died: 14 August 1944 (aged 42); Brandenburg-Görden Prison, Nazi Germany
- Occupation: Metal worker
- Years active: 1929-1944
- Known for: Anti-Nazi activism
- Political party: Communist Party of Germany
- Movement: German Resistance
- Criminal penalty: Execution

Arthur Sodtke (25 December 1901 – 14 August 1944) was a German Communist resistance fighter, he was active in Berlin and sentenced to death by the Volksgerichtshof in 1944.

== Biography ==
Arthur Sodtke was born in Inowrazlaw, Province of Posen (Inowrocław, Poland). His father Gustav Sodtke was a roofer. The family moved to Berlin in 1904, where Arthur Sodtke grew up.

Sodtke lived in Berlin-Prenzlauer Berg and became a metal worker. He was a member of the works council of the Schultheiss brewery and joined the German Communist Party in 1929. In 1933 he became active in the resistance against the Nazis. He was arrested in 1936 for distributing antifascist leaflets at his workplace in the Berlin plant of the "Dürener Metallwerke", but was soon released after the same leaflets were found again while he was in custody. In World War II he joined the resistance group of Heinrich Preuß, Wilhelm Rietze and Robert Uhrig, for whom he contacted antifascists at Borsig, Gottfried Lindner AG and the Schultheiss brewery.

Sodtke was arrested on 4 February 1942 and imprisoned at Sachsenhausen concentration camp and Potsdam prison. The Volksgerichtshof sentenced him to death on 21 June 1944 along with Wilhelm Böse, Johann Pierschke, Walter Strohmann und Hermann Tops. The sentence was carried out on 14 August 1944 at Brandenburg-Görden Prison.

== Remembrance ==
- The Sodtkestrasse in Berlin-Prenzlauer Berg was named in his honour in 1948
- Memorial plaque at his former residence, Schönhauser Allee 39b in Berlin
