= Brandenburg-Görden Prison =

Prison in Germany

Coordinates: 52.4219°N 12.4716°E

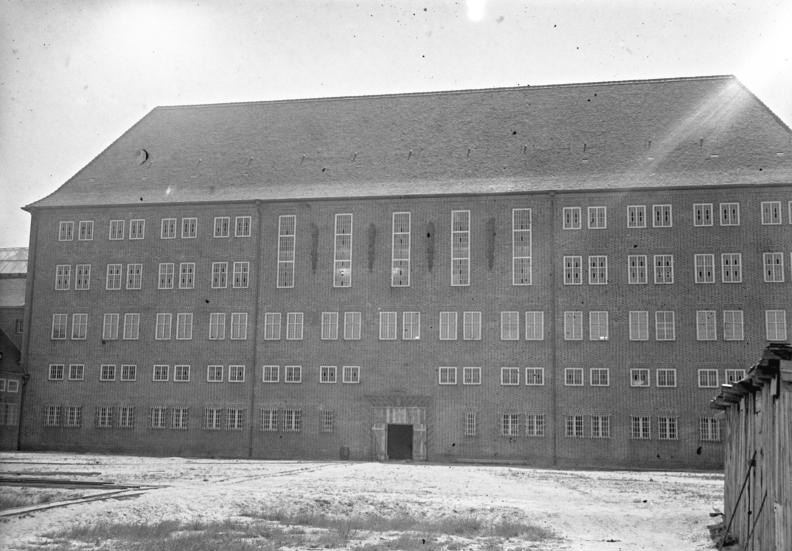
Newly erected main building in 1931

Brandenburg-Görden Prison is located on Anton-Saefkow-Allee in the Görden quarter of Brandenburg an der Havel, Germany. Erected between 1927 and 1935, it was built to be the most secure and modern prison in Europe. Both criminal and political prisoners were sent there, as well as people imprisoned for preventive detention or for interrogation and prisoners of war. Built with a capacity of 1,800, it sometimes held over 4,000 during the Nazi era. After the war, East Germany used the prison to incarcerate at least 170,000 people. Prisoners were used for labor, to make things such as tractors, kitchen furniture, uniforms and radiation suits, electric motors, shoes, and cars.

== History ==
A first Zuchthaus in Brandenburg was established on Neuendorfer Straße in 1820. The old Brandenburg Prison was closed in 1931 because of its disastrous hygienic conditions, but later housed a Nazi concentration camp from August 1933 till February 1934. It later became the site of the Brandenburg Euthanasia Centre, part of the Nazis' involuntary euthanasia program known later as Aktion T4, where from February to October 1940, some 10,000 disabled, intellectually disabled or mentally ill people were gassed based on official numbers.

Upon the Nazi Machtergreifung, the new prison in Görden became an instrument of political repression and terror. It was a Zuchthaus for inmates with lengthy or life sentences at hard labor, as well as prisoners who had been sentenced to death. Initially, there weren't many political prisoners at the new prison, but during the war years, the share increased to about 60%.

In 1940, Brandenburg-Görden became one of the selected central execution sites established throughout Germany by the order of Adolf Hitler and Reich Minister of Justice Franz Gürtner. An execution chamber was installed, using what had previously been a garage, with a guillotine and a gallows. The total number of executions was 2,743 and took place between 1 August 1940 and 20 April 1945, most of them convicts sentenced to death by Sondergerichte courts of the notorious People's Court under President Roland Freisler. The youngest victim was a 15-year-old French boy. By the end of 1942, "preventive detention" prisoners, such as Jews, Roma, Sinti, Russians and Ukrainians were sent to concentration camps.

Several victims were members of the 20 July plot, about 100 were Bible Students condemned as conscientious objectors. By the end of the Nazi era, from 1933–1945, roughly 4,300 people had been imprisoned at Brandenburg-Görden. A total of 1,722 people, who were sentenced for political reasons, were executed there. 652 other political prisoners died from disease and seven committed suicide.

The Red Army liberated the prison during the Battle of Berlin on 27 April 1945, finding around 3,600 prisoners, including 180 awaiting execution. After the war, the Soviet Army imprisoned collaborators here until 1947, primarily members of the Russian Liberation Army. Until 1989, the German Democratic Republic also used the correctional facility for political prisoners. Since 1975, there has been a memorial room at the prison, which is today part of a Justizvollzugsanstalt complex.

== The present ==
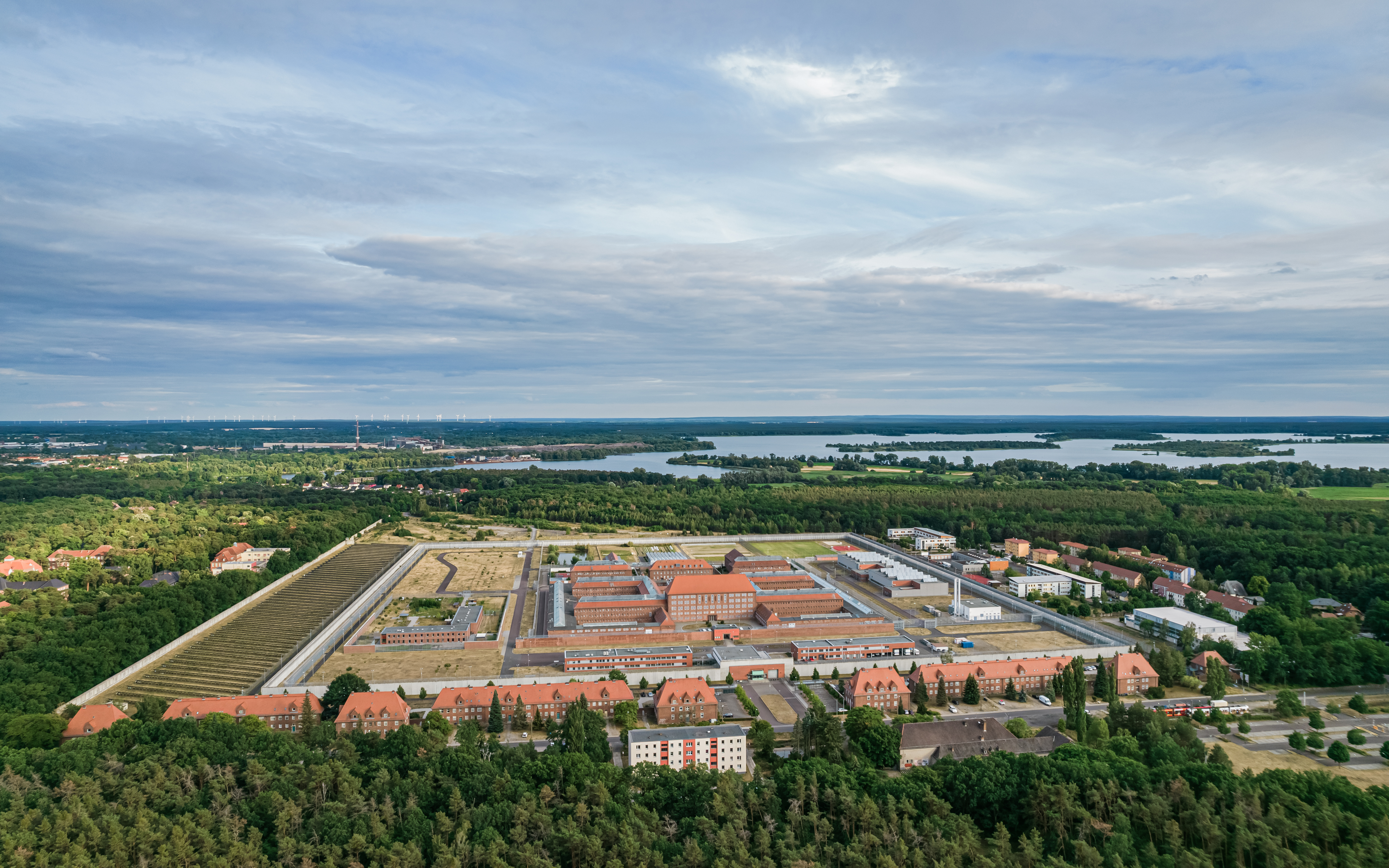
Aerial photograph, 2022

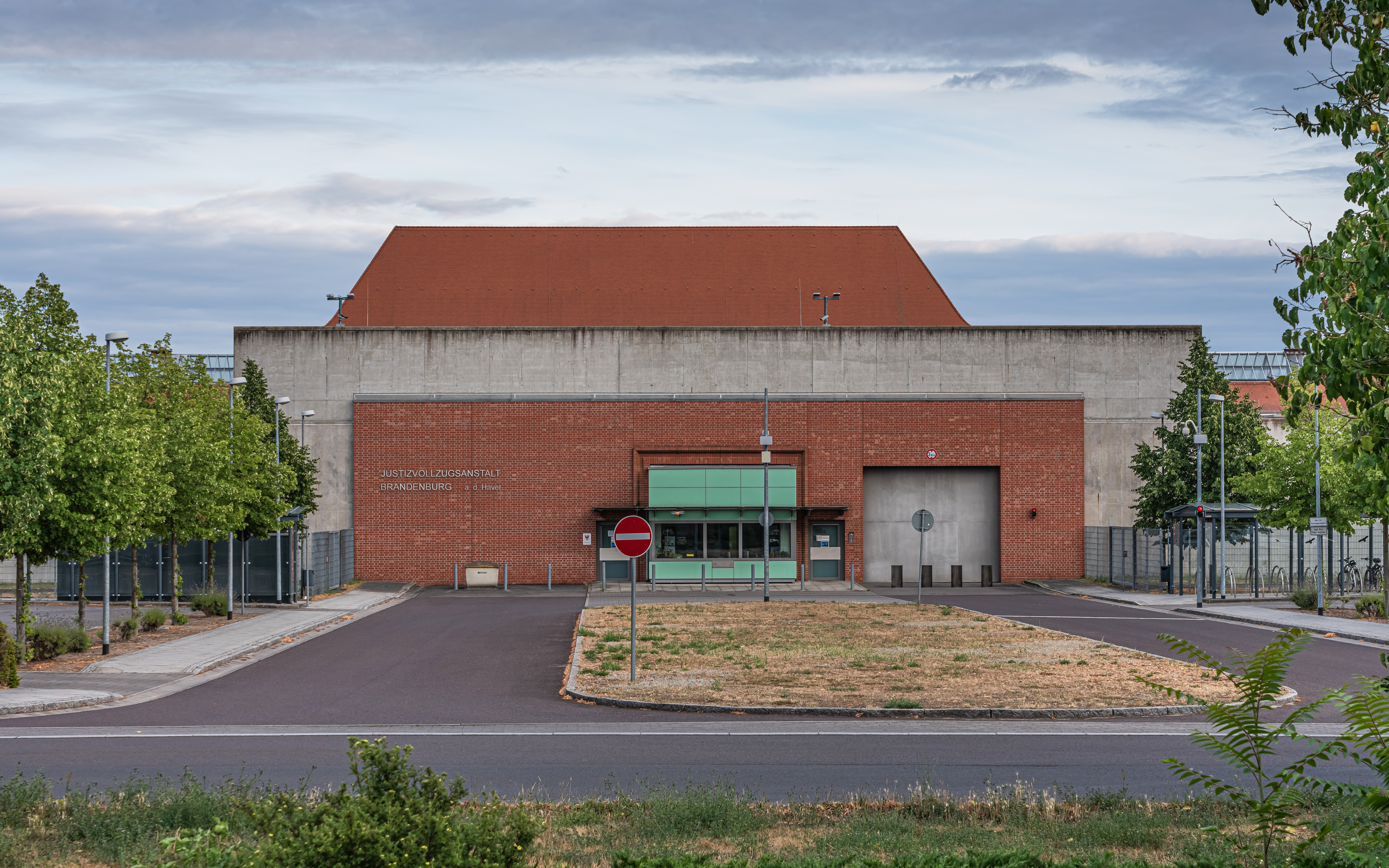
The entrance, 2022

Today the prison is divided into three main sections, plus a social therapy wing and prison hospital. There is a jail for 88 adults, a medium security wing for 330 adult men and a minimum security wing for 100 adult men. In addition, there is a social therapy wing with 80 men and a prison hospital with 32 beds. There are another 36 beds in the transport wing for prisoners who are being moved from one location to another. The JVA Brandenburg is a men's prison and is supported by a total staff of 439, of whom 145 are women.

Prisoners there have sentences from temporary detention to life, the most severe sentence in Germany. Life sentence does not, however, mean one is to spend the rest of one's life in prison, rather that it is for an undetermined, but long time with a minimum of 15 years. After 15 years, the sentence may be commuted.

The prison underwent renovations that were completed in 2014. Security and technical equipment were upgraded. The prison remained operational during this time.

The street where the prison exists is now named for one of the people executed there, Anton Saefkow.

== Notable prisoners ==
(Many of the people on this list are notable because they later became important in the German Democratic Republic. For more information on any of the people below, see the list on the German version of this page.)

- Ernst Albert Altenkirch, 1935?–1945
- Bruno Baum, 1937–1945
- Dieter Borkowski, 1971–1972
- Hermann Brill, 1939–1943
- Otto Buchwitz, 1941–1945
- Ernst Busch, 1943–1945
- Karl Wilhelm Fricke, 1956–1959
- Michael Gartenschläger, 1961–1971
- Paul Hatschek, 1943?–1944
- Robert Havemann, 1943–1945
- Walter Hochmuth, 1942?–1945
- Walter Hösterey, 1942–1945
- Erich Honecker, 1937–1945
- Wilhelm Kling, 1937–1945
- Erich Kürschner (resistance fighter), 1938–1945
- Fritz Lange, 1943–1945
- Alfred Lemmnitz, 1941–1945
- Bruno Max Leuschner, 1936–1940
- Hans Litten, 1934
- Horst Mahler, 1936–
- Friedrich Minoux, 1941–1945
- Alfred Neumann, 1942–1945
- Ernst Niekisch, 1939–1945
- Herbert Sandberg, 1934
- Ernst Sasse, 1942–1945
- Hermann Schlimme, 1938–1940
- Alexander Schwab, from 1937
- Kurt Seibt, 1941–1945
- Harry Seidel, 1963–1966
- Frank Schmökel, –1993
- Wolfgang Welsch (refugee helper), 1966

== Executed or died at Brandenburg-Görden Prison ==
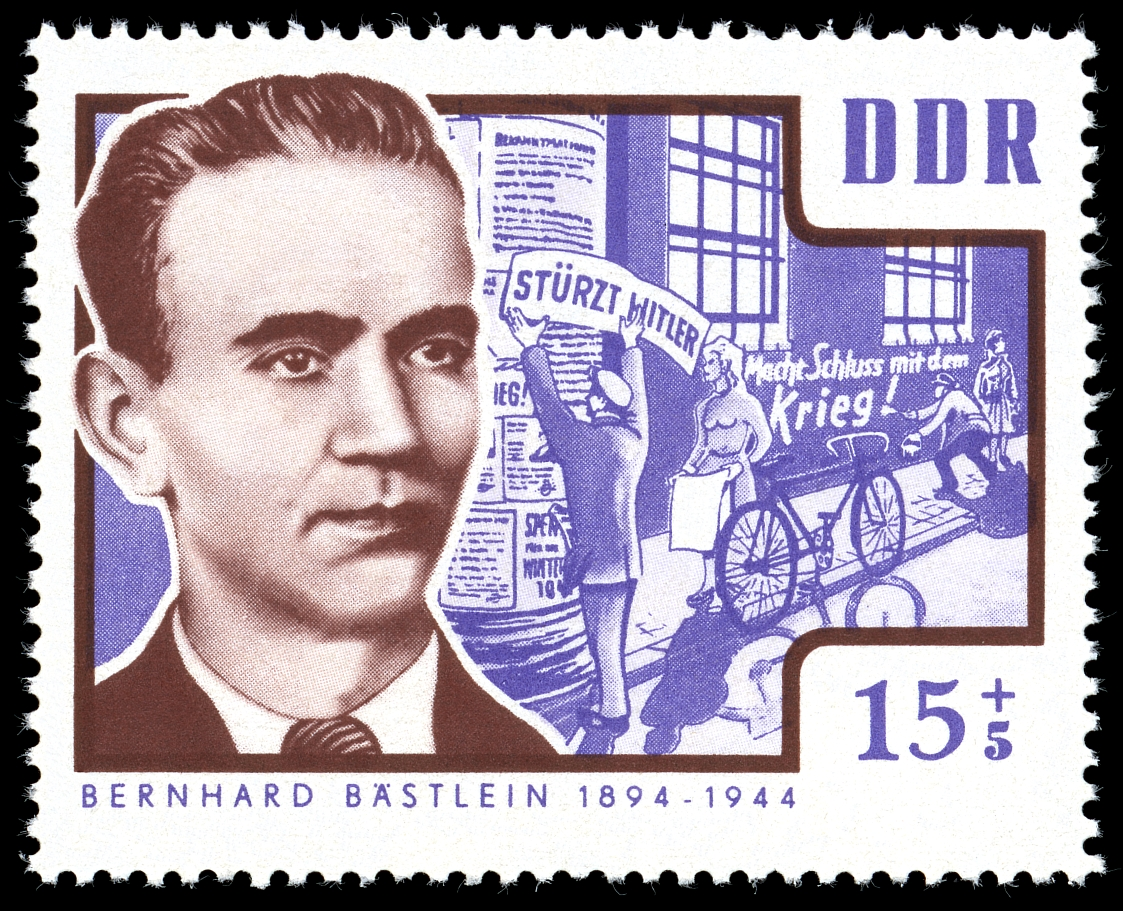
Bernhard Bästlein, executed at Brandenburg-Görden

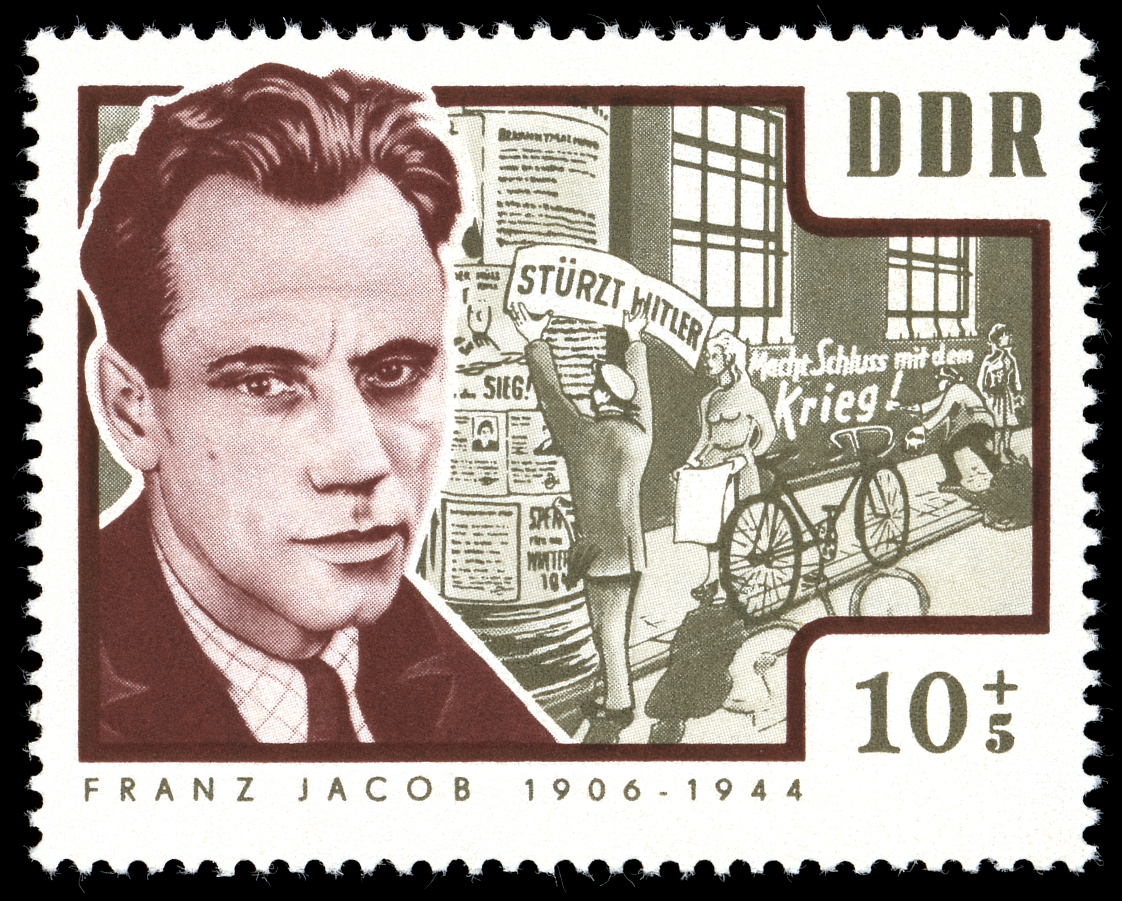
Franz Jacob, executed at Brandenburg-Görden

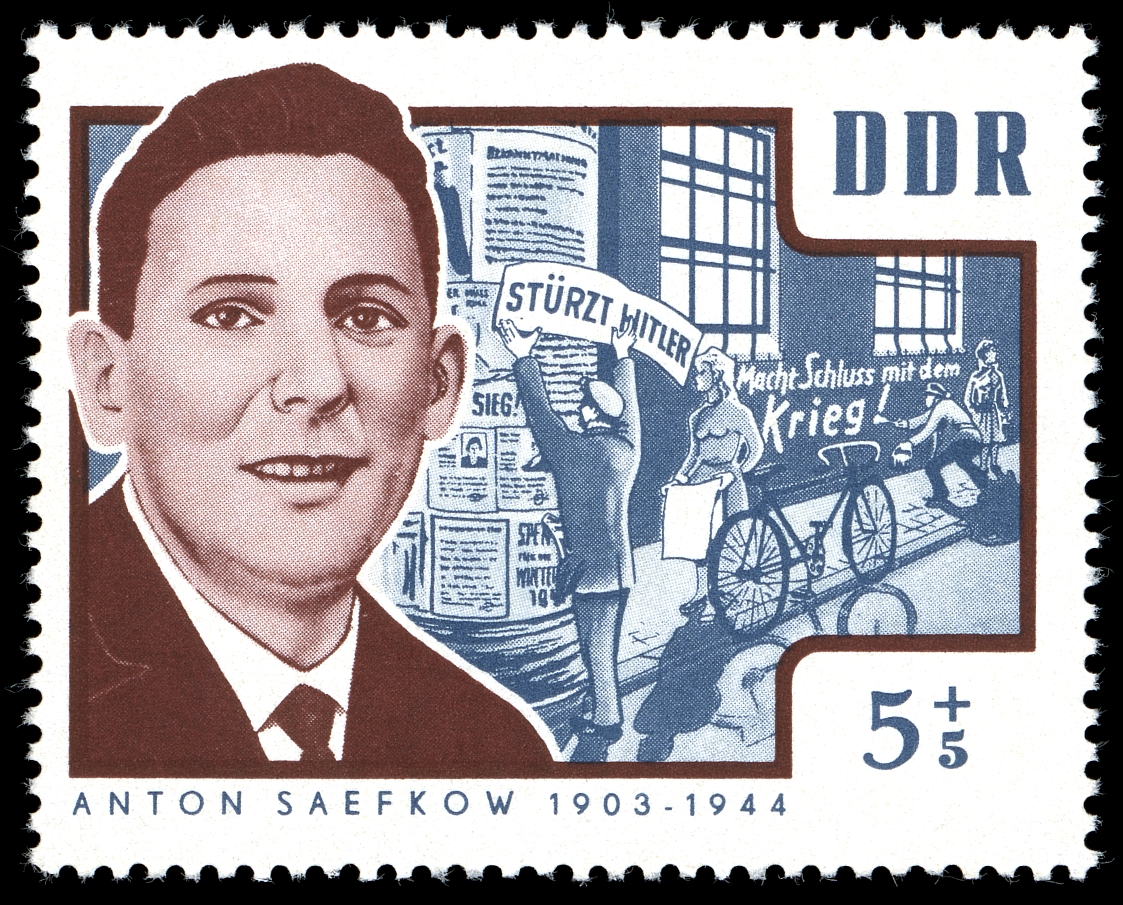
Anton Saefkow, executed at Brandenburg-Görden

- Bernhard Almstadt, Communist and Resistance fighter, executed on 6 November 1944
- Hans Anhalt, Nazi war criminal, died in prison on 13 April 1975
- Walter Arndt, zoologist, executed on 26 June 1944
- Friedrich Aue, Communist and Resistance fighter, executed on 27 November 1944
- Bernhard Bästlein, Communist and co-founder of Saefkow-Jacob-Bästlein Organization, executed on 18 September 1944
- Bruno Binnebesel, Catholic Priest and Resistance fighter, executed on 13 November 1944
- Max Borrack, Resistance fighter, executed on 19 February 1945
- Walter Budeus, Communist and Resistance fighter, executed on 21 August 1944
- Jean-Marie Derscheid, zoologist, executed on 13 March 1944
- Hermann Danz, Communist and Resistance fighter, executed on 5 February 1945
- Leo Drabent, Communist and resistance fighter, executed on 20 November 1944
- Friedrich Fromm, Officer of the Reichswehr and the Wehrmacht, executed on 12 March 1945
- Paul Gesche, Communist and Resistance fighter, executed on 21 August 1944
- Claudius Gosau, Communist and Resistance fighter, executed on 6 March 1944
- Alois Grimm, Jesuit priest, educator, theologian, hanged on 11 September 1944
- Georg Groscurth, doctor, co-founder of European Union (resistance group), executed on 8 May 1944
- Nikolaus Christoph von Halem, jurist, businessman and Resistance fighter, executed on 9 October 1944
- Ernst Hampel, Communist and Resistance fighter, executed on 20 April 1945
- Paul Hatschek, Czech engineer and member of the European Union, executed on 15 May 1944
- Michael Hirschberg, SPD Resistance fighter, died from heart attack from injuries after arrest, 20 March 1937
- Martin Rasmussen Hjelmen, Norwegian Communist and Resistance fighter, executed on 30 May 1944
- Cäsar Horn, Communist and Resistance fighter, executed on 19 March 1945
- Franz Jacob, Communist and co-founder of Saefkow-Jacob-Bästlein Organization and Bästlein-Jacob-Abshagen Group, executed 1944
- Franz Jägerstätter, Catholic conscientious objector, executed on 9 August 1943
- Erich Knauf, author, executed on 2 May 1944
- Wilhelm Knöchel, Communist and Resistance fighter, executed on 24 July 1944
- Alfred Kowalke, Communist and Resistance fighter, executed on 6 March 1944
- Wolfgang Kusserow, Jehovah's Witness conscientious objector, executed on 28 March 1942
- Alois Laub, member of Czechoslovak anti-nazi resistance, executed on 19 February 1945
- Arthur Ladwig, Communist and Resistance fighter, executed on 10 July 1944
- Georg Lehnig, Communist and Resistance fighter, executed on 28 March 1945
- Karl Lühr, mayor of Woltersdorf (Wendland, Lower Saxony), executed on 20 December 1943
- Rudolf Mandrella, executed on 3 September 1943
- Albert Merz, Christadelphian conscientious objector, executed on 3 April 1941
- Franz Mett, Communist and Resistance fighter, executed on 21 August 1944
- Max Josef Metzger, Catholic priest, executed on 17 April 1944
- Joseph Müller, Catholic priest, executed on 11 September 1944
- Kurt Müller, Communist and Resistance fighter, executed on 26 June 1944
- Theodor Neubauer, Communist and Resistance fighter, executed on 5 February 1945
- Hans Neumann, Communist and Resistance fighter, executed on 20 November 1944
- Erwin Nöldner, Communist and Resistance fighter, executed on 6 November 1944
- Stanislaus Peplinski, Polish forced laborer from Waldsee and member of Speyerer Kameradschaft, executed on 19 March 1945
- Barly Devold Paul Pettersen, Norwegian Communist and Resistance fighter, executed on 30 May 1944
- Siegfried Rädel, Communist and Resistance fighter, executed on 10 May 1943
- Franz Reinisch, Catholic priest, executed on 21 August 1942
- Paul Rentsch, dentist, member of the European Union (resistance group), beheaded on 8 May 1944
- Fritz Riedel, Resistance fighter, executed on 21 August 1944
- Wilhelm Rietze, Communist and Resistance fighter, executed on 28 August 1944
- Kurt Ritter, Communist and Resistance fighter, executed on 28 August 1944
- Friedrich Rödel, Communist and Resistance fighter, executed on 5 February 1945
- Beppo Römer, Resistance fighter, executed on 25 September 1944
- Axel Rudolph, author of adventure and crime stories, guillotined on 30 October 1944
- Jakob Schultheis, Social Democrat and member of Speyerer Kameradschaft, executed on 19 March 1945
- Anton Saefkow, Communist and co-founder of Saefkow-Jacob-Bästlein Organization, executed on 18 September 1944
- Willi Sänger, Communist and Resistance fighter, executed on 27 November 1944
- Johann Schellheimer, Communist and Resistance fighter, on 5 February 1945
- Otto Schmirgal, Communist and Resistance fighter, executed on 15 December 1944
- Martin Schwantes, Communist and Resistance fighter, executed on 5 February 1945
- Bernhard Schwentner, Catholic priest, executed on 30 October 1944
- Werner Seelenbinder, athlete and Communist, executed on 24 October 1944
- Fritz Siedentopf, Communist and Resistance fighter, executed on 28 August 1944
- Max Sievers, Freethinker, executed on 17 January 1944
- Arthur Sodtke, worker, athlete and Communist, executed on 14 August 1944
- Robert Uhrig, Communist and Resistance fighter, died on 21 August 1944
- Franz Virnich, jurist and Catholic Verbindungsstudent (CV), died on 5 April 1943
- Ernst Volkmann, Catholic conscientious objector, executed on 9 August 1941
- Alfons Maria Wachsmann, Catholic theologian, executed on 21 February 1944
- Arthur Weisbrodt, Communist and Resistance fighter, executed on 6 November 1944
- Martin Weise, Communist and Resistance fighter, executed on 15 November 1943
- Hans Wölfel, jurist and Catholic Resistance fighter, executed on 3 July 1944
- Johannes Wüsten, author and Communist, died on 26 April 1943
- Konstantin Zadkevic, Resistance fighter and Dr in chemistry, leaked information related to the Nazis Nuclear program, executed on 30 October 1944
- Walter Zimmermann, resistance fighter (Saefkow-Jacob-Bästlein Organization), executed on 8 January 1945
- Johannes Zoschke, metal worker, sailor, sports enthusiast and anti-fascist Resistance fighter, executed on 26 October 1944

== See also ==
- Brandenburg Euthanasia Center
- Capital punishment
- Killing centers
- Nazi elimination of political opponents
- Penal labor
