= Walter Budeus =

German communist and resistance fighter against Nazism (1902–1944)

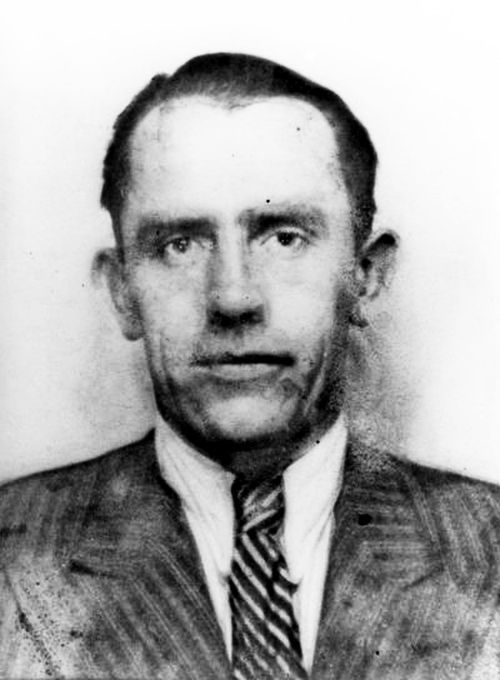
Walter Budeus

Walter Budeus (29 October 1902 – 21 August 1944) was a German communist and resistance fighter against Nazism.

== Biography ==
Budeus was born in Zossen. He trained as a machine fitter, and joined the Communist Party of Germany (KPD) in 1931. After the Nazi Party came to power in 1933, Budeus was active in the underground communist resistance. In 1936, he set up an illegal resistance cell at the Deutsche Waffen und Munitionsfabriken factory where he worked, organizing more than 50 workers.

From the late 1930s, Budeus worked closely with the resistance group led by Robert Uhrig, distributing pamphlets, making contacts with other resistance fighters and collecting information on arms production and the political mood of the German population. On 4 February 1942, Budeus was arrested by the Gestapo. He was detained for more than two years in Sachsenhausen concentration camp and Brandenburg Prison before being sentenced to death by the People's Court on 7 June 1944. He was executed by guillotine on 21 August 1944 in Brandenburg-Görden Prison.

A street in the Friedrichsfelde locality of Berlin was named Walter-Budeus-Straße from 14 January 1976 until 1981.
