= Cäsar Horn =

German resistance member

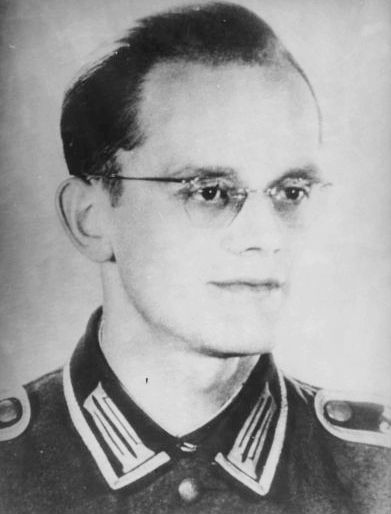
Cäsar Horn

Cäsar Horn (18 May 1914 – 19 March 1945) was a German communist and resistance fighter against Nazism.

== Biography ==
Horn, a clerk, was born in Berlin. He joined both the Young Communist League of Germany (KJVD) and the Communist Party of Germany (KPD) in 1932. He was also active in the workers' sports club "Fichte". After the Nazi Party came to power in 1933, Horn joined the underground resistance and was active in the publication of an illegal newspaper, Der Scheinwerfer.

In 1934, Horn joined the Reich Labour Service in order to provide a cover for his resistance activities. Despite this, his membership in the illegal workers' sports association Kampfgemeinschaft für Rote Sporteinheit was discovered in 1935. Horn was sentenced to 18 months' imprisonment, which he served in Moabit Prison in Berlin and Börgermoor concentration camp in Emsland. After his release, Horn continued his resistance activities.

Horn was conscripted into the Wehrmacht in 1939. In 1943, he established contacts with the Saefkow-Jacob-Bästlein Organization, a resistance group. He was tasked with spreading anti-fascist messages amongst Wehrmacht soldiers, encouraging them to desert and join the anti-Nazi resistance instead.

On 19 July 1944, Horn was arrested, and on 23 January 1945 he was tried by the People's Court and sentenced to death. He was executed by guillotine on 19 March 1945 in Brandenburg-Görden Prison.
