= Anton Saefkow =

German resistance fighter and communist (1903–1944)

- Born: Anton Emil Hermann Saefkow; 22 July 1903; Berlin, Province of Brandenburg, Kingdom of Prussia, German Empire
- Died: 18 September 1944 (aged 41); Brandenburg-Görden Prison, Province of Brandenburg, Free State of Prussia, Nazi Germany
- Political party: KPD (after 1924)
- Spouse(s): Theodora Brey (m. 1932; div. 1938) Änne Thiebes (m. 1939)
- Other offices held: 1932–1933: Political Leader, Wasserkante (Hamburg-Schleswig-Holstein) KPD

Anton Emil Hermann Saefkow (German: [ˈantoːn ˈzɛfkoː]; 22 July 1903 – 18 September 1944) was a German Communist and a resistance fighter against the Nazi régime. He was arrested in July 1944 and executed on 18 September by guillotine.

== Early life ==
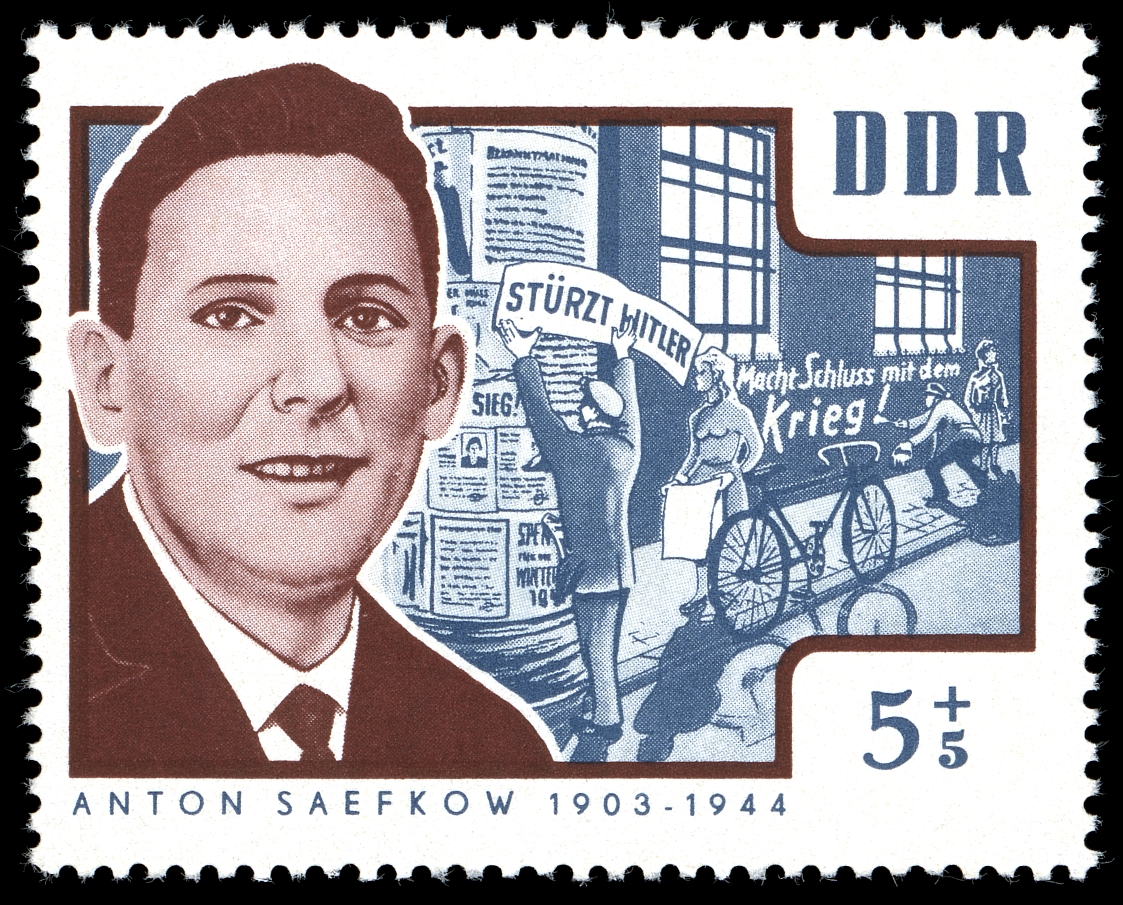
Anton Saefkow in a 1964 stamp from the German Democratic Republic

Anton Saefkow was born in Berlin, a member of a socialist working-class family and in 1920 while still a metalworker's apprentice, joined the Young Communist League of Germany to whose Berlin leadership he rose in 1922.

== Activism ==
In 1927, he became secretary of the Communist Party of Germany (KPD) in Berlin, then in Dresden. From 1929 to 1932, he led the Revolutionary Trade Union Opposition (Revolutionäre Gewerkschafts-Opposition; RGO) in the KPD Ruhr district and became in 1932 political leader of the KPD's Wasserkante district in Hamburg. In 1932, Saefkow married Theodora Brey who was also active in the underground resistance.

== Imprisonment ==
From April 1933 to April 1934, Saefkow was in a concentration camp, followed by two and a half years in a Zuchthaus at hard labour, followed by a spell at the Dachau concentration camp. There, he organized an illegal remembrance service for Edgar André and as a result was given another two years of imprisonment.

== Resistance ==
Released from detention in July 1939, Saefkow went back to the illegal political work. He divorced Thea Saefkow and married Anna Thiebes (Änne) in 1941. In Berlin, after the attack on the Soviet Union in 1941, he built up the biggest KPD resistance group, called the "Operative Leadership of the KPD". In 1944, he, Bernhard Bästlein and Franz Jacob led the Saefkow-Jacob-Bästlein Organization which agitated against the war in Berlin munitions plants, and called on people to commit sabotage.

In April 1944, the Social Democrat Adolf Reichwein made contact with Saefkow with a view to involve him with the KPD group in the 20 July Plot which sought to assassinate or otherwise overthrow Adolf Hitler. It eventually took the form of the well-known 20 July bomb attack on the Führer at the latter's HQ, the Wolf's Lair in East Prussia. It famously failed with dire consequences for the plotters.

== Arrest and execution ==
In July 1944, Saefkow was arrested, sentenced to death by the "People's Court" Volksgerichtshof on 5 September and executed on 18 September by guillotine at Brandenburg-Görden Prison in Brandenburg an der Havel.

Saefkow left behind a wife and two daughters. Shortly before his death, he wrote to his wife Änne:

"Through this letter I want to thank you, my comrade, for the greatness and beauty that you have given me in our life together... Not until today, writing these lines, thinking about you all, have my eyes moistened since the sentencing. For the pain, which might tear me apart, restrains reason. You know, I am militant and shall die bravely. I only ever wanted to do good..."

== Memorials ==
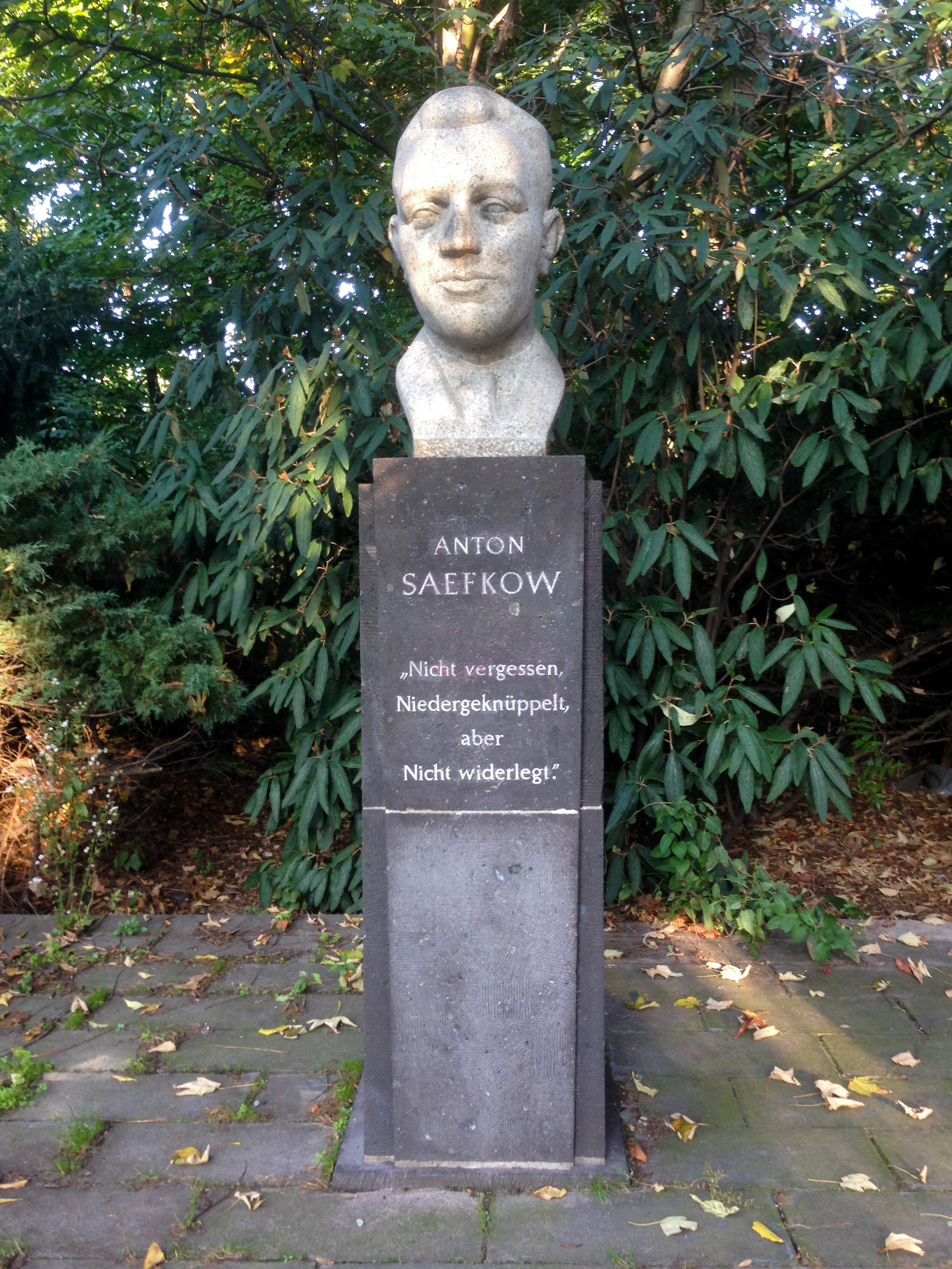
Anton Saefkow bust in Berlin

On 2 February 1975, a square in Berlin was named after Anton Saefkow. Franz Jacob and Bernhard Bästlein were also honoured by having streets in the same neighbourhood named after them. In Prenzlauer Berg, a greenspace called Anton-Saefkow-Park is not only named for Saefkow, but also features a bust of him. In Brandenburg an der Havel, the street running in front of the very prison where Saefkow and many other members of the antifascist resistance were executed has been named Anton-Saefkow-Allee.
