= Würfel =

Würfel is a surname. Notable people with the surname include:

- Gesche Würfel (born 1976), visual artist born in Germany
- Günther Würfel (born 1948), Austrian sprinter
- Wilhelm Würfel (1790–1832), Czech composer, pianist, and conductor
