= Werner Seelenbinder =

German communist and wrestler (1904–1944)

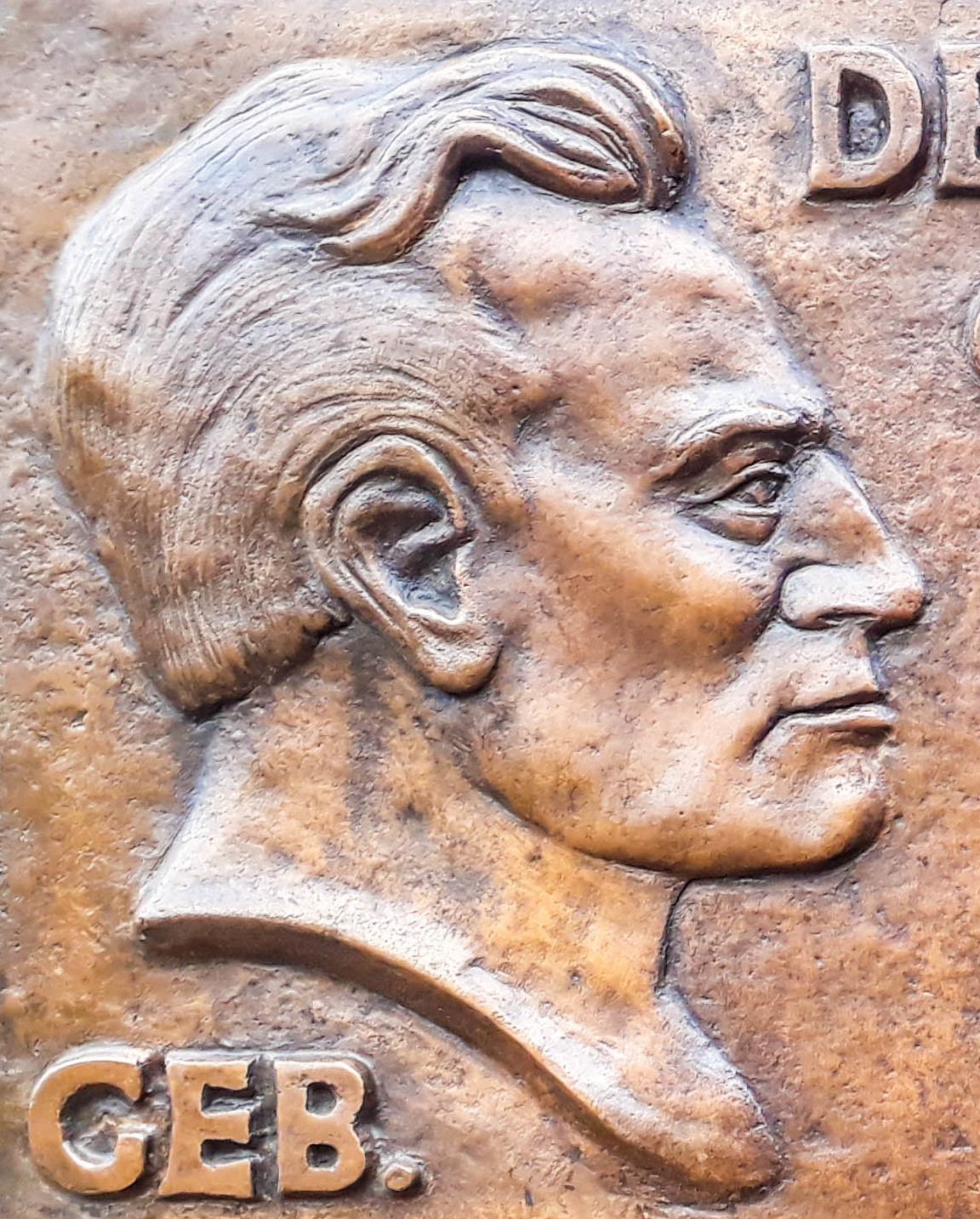
Plaque to Werner Seelenbinder in Berlin-Köpenick (detail)

Werner Seelenbinder (2 August 1904 – 24 October 1944) was a German communist and wrestler.

== Early years ==
Seelenbinder was born in Stettin, Pomerania (modern-day Poland), and became a wrestler after training as a joiner. He had connections with the young people's workers' movement from an early age. Seelenbinder won the light heavyweight class of Greco-Roman wrestling at the 1925 Workers' Olympiad in Frankfurt. In 1928 and 1929 he won the Spartakiad in Moscow; over 200 German sportsmen were banned from the contest, but Seelenbinder, with his interest in Marxism, took part. His first trip to Moscow had already persuaded him to become a member of the Communist Party of Germany (KPD). In 1933 he refused to give the Nazi salute when receiving his medal at the German Wrestling Championship, and was punished with a sixteen-month ban on training and sports events.

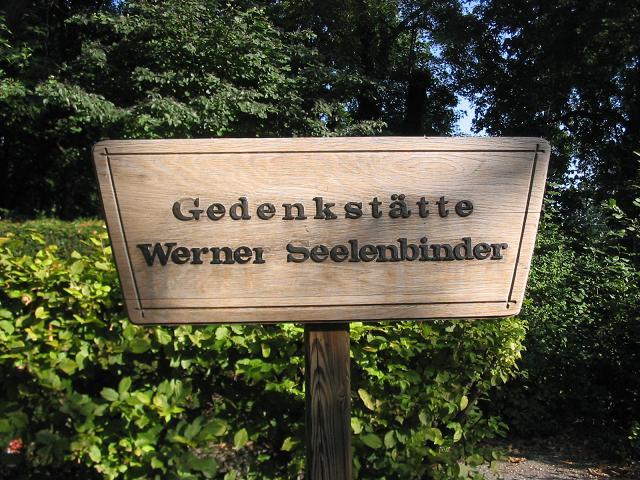
Memorial and grave in Neukölln

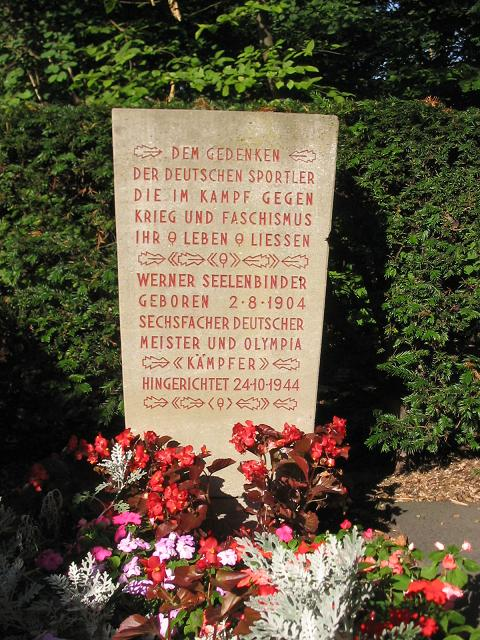
Sports park in Neukölln

German workers' sports clubs were soon banned by the Nazi party; at this point the KPD approached Seelenbinder, asking him to join one of the legal sports clubs, to train to get as much sporting success as possible, so he would be able to carry messages across Germany and into other countries. As one of the country's top sportsmen he had more freedom of movement and could travel abroad. As well as preparing for the Olympics, Seelenbinder joined the Uhrig Group, an underground resistance group named after Robert Uhrig, who organized it.

== 1936 Olympics and arrest ==
As a committed communist Seelenbinder was appalled by the 1936 Olympic Games that were to be held in Nazi Germany. He had originally planned to boycott it, but friends persuaded him to compete anyway, win, and defy the Nazis by not giving the required Nazi salute, but to use a vulgar gesture instead. This plan was foiled when he lost the first match. He eventually came in fourth in the event.

The Nazis had only allowed Seelenbinder to take part in the Olympics because they thought he would secure them a medal: otherwise, they did not trust him in the slightest. Seelenbinder's illegal activities as a courier and his participation in the Uhrig Group had caught their attention: he was arrested, along with 65 other members of the group, on 4 February 1942 and after being tortured for eight days, and enduring nine camps and prisons for two and half years, he was sentenced to death by the Volksgerichtshof, and was beheaded for treason on 24 October 1944 at Brandenburg-Görden Prison. The imprisonment left him weighing a mere 60 kilograms (132 pounds), from his previous weight of 90 kilos (198 pounds).

In his farewell letter, he wrote to his father:

The time has now come for me to say goodbye. In the time of my imprisonment I must have gone through every type of torture a man can possibly endure. Ill health and physical and mental agony, I have been spared nothing. I would have liked to have experienced the delights and comforts of life, which I now appreciate twice as much, with you all, with my friends and fellow sportsmen, after the war. The times I had with you were great, and I lived on them during my incarceration, and wished back that wonderful time. Sadly fate has now decided differently, after a long time of suffering. But I know that I have found a place in all your hearts and in the hearts of many sports followers, a place where I will always hold my ground. This knowledge makes me proud and strong and will not let me be weak in my last moments.

== Memorials and controversy ==
On 29 July 1945 an urn containing Seelenbinder's ashes was buried at the site of his old club, the Berolina 03 Sports Club stadium in Neukölln, Berlin. At the same time, the stadium itself was named "Werner-Seelenbinder-Kampfbahn", but as the Cold War escalated and the political climate in West Germany became increasingly anti-communist, it was renamed "Stadion Neukölln" in 1949. A number of schools, streets and sporting facilities in the former East Germany were named after him. The Werner Seelenbinder Wrestling Tournament is still (2004) held once a year in Berlin. However, the lack of impartiality by both the anti-communist West Germans and the pro-communist East Germans, who raised Werner Seelenbinder to the status of an icon, means that today his historical importance is rather controversial. In an article in the socialist German newspaper Neues Deutschland of 2 August 2004, the director of the Berlin Sports Museum Martina Behrendt said that his role in the resistance movement had been exaggerated in the GDR, and that there were no reliable biographies.

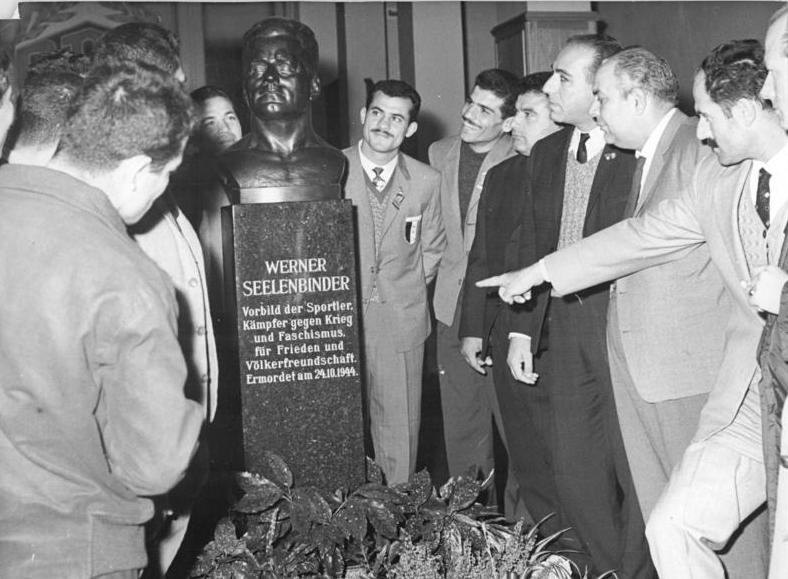
A delegation of boxers from Syria looking at a bust of Seelenbinder in the Werner-Seelenbinder-Halle, 1963

On 2 August 2004 a commemorative speech was held in front of the Neukölln stadium, where Seelenbinder's ashes were buried, by the Party of Democratic Socialism, on the 100th anniversary of Seelenbinder's birth. Party members spoke of their regret that the stadium had been renamed. Others mentioned with sadness the renaming of the eastern German "Werner-Seelenbinder-Halle" as "Velodrom im Europasportpark" in 1990 and the renaming of the "Werner-Seelenbinder-Turm" in Leipzig as the "Glockenturm". On 24 October 2004, the 60th anniversary of Seelenbinder's death, the Neukölln stadium was once again renamed the "Werner-Seelenbinder-Stadion" in his memory.

In 1950, an indoor sporting arena named after Seelenbinder, the Werner-Seelenbinder-Halle, was opened in the Prenzlauer Berg district, then in East Berlin. It had a capacity of 10,000 people, and was regularly used as a convention hall by East German mass organizations, such as the Free German Youth and Socialist Unity Party of Germany. It was also used as a concert arena, where musicians such as Depeche Mode, Jonathan Richman and The Wedding Present, as well as German acts, such as Feeling B and Rio Reiser, performed. It was demolished in 1993, after the fall of East Germany, and replaced by the present-day Velodrom.

In 1964, the Nordic Yards Warnemünde ship yard (the former Warnowwerft), launched a 7,704 gross tonnage cargo ship named Werner Seelenbinder. She was scrapped in 1988 – before the collapse of the GDR. She remained named after the athlete throughout her career, apart from her final voyage to Alang for breaking up, for which she was re-registered and renamed MILOS-1.

Seelenbinder was inducted to Germany's Sports Hall of Fame in 2008.

== Biography ==
Seelenbinder has been most recently biographied by the New Zealand writer James McNeish.
