= Katharina Jacob =

Teacher and member of German Resistance against Nazism (1907–1989)

- Born: Katharina Emmermann; 6 March 1907; Cologne, Germany
- Died: 23 August 1989 (aged 82); Hamburg, Germany
- Occupations: Teacher; member of the German Resistance movement
- Political party: Communist
- Spouses: Walter Hochmuth (m. 1927–1939) Franz Jacob (m. 1941; died 1944)
- Children: 2

Katharina Jacob (née Emmermann, formerly Hochmuth; 6 March 1907 – 23 August 1989) was a teacher and member of the German Resistance movement against National Socialism. She was married to Franz Jacob, a German Resistance fighter who was executed by the Nazis.

== Biography ==
Jacob was born Katharina Emmermann in Cologne. She married Walter Hochmuth in 1927. He was a Communist politician and member of the Hamburg Parliament during the Weimar Republic. She joined the Communist Party (KPD) in 1928. They had one daughter together, Ursel, born in 1931. After the Nazis seized power in 1933, Walter Hochmuth appeared on a wanted poster and went underground. He had an affair with the woman who had given him a place to stay, and they had a son in March 1934. He and Katharina divorced in 1939.

Katharina was arrested several times. She was politically active in the German Resistance and was sent to Lübeck-Lauerhof from 1934 to 1936 and to KolaFu in 1938. Whenever she was under arrest, her daughter was left with no parent. Political friends took care of Ursel, as well as neighbors and her teacher at school, Gertrud Klempau. A chapter in the book, Schule unterm Hakenkreuz ("School Under the Swastika") is dedicated to her.

In December 1941, she married Franz Jacob, whom she had known from the Young Communist League. He moved in with her and her daughter, Ursel, into her apartment at Jarresstraße 21. She continued her Resistance activities, collecting food ration cards for forced laborers and listened to Radio Moscow. The broadcasts enabled the families of soldiers to get information about their loved ones and provided information for the flyers that Franz Jacob was producing. Their friend, Charlotte Groß, a courier, smuggled these illegal leaflets to Berlin.

A wave of arrests in Hamburg in October 1942 prompted Franz Jacob to flee to Berlin. The following month, their daughter, Ilse, was born on 9 November 1942. Groß brought news to Jacob's husband, underground in Berlin. Jacob took a road trip with her daughters, stopping secretly to see Franz in Berlin and staying just one night. It was the only time Franz saw his infant daughter.

Jacob and Groß were arrested on 6 July 1944. Prosecutors sought the death penalty for Groß, but she received a ten-year sentence at hard labor in a Zuchthaus instead. Lack of evidence prevented the court from passing sentence on Jacob, but nonetheless, she was not released. Rather, she was taken in protective custody and sent to the women's concentration camp at Ravensbrück. There she was freed by Soviet soldiers on 1 May 1945.

Franz Jacob was arrested in Berlin in autumn 1944. He was sentenced to death on 5 September 1944 and executed thirteen days later at Brandenburg-Görden Prison.

=== After WWII ===
Jacob survived the war and became a teacher at the Schule Winterhuder Weg. She remained politically active and was involved in the Union of Persecutees of the Nazi Regime (Vereinigung der Verfolgten des Naziregimes), an association of victims of Nazi persecution. Years later, she was asked if her fight against Adolf Hitler had been worth it.

Fifty-five million people in Germany and Europe were wiped out; gassed, fallen on the front lines, died where they lived. Should one not ask here if their deaths had any purpose? ... The Resistance fighters put their lives on the line for humanity and peace. My husband fell on this front. I also followed my conscience and convictions. The decision was not easy. But to see wrong and do nothing about it? I had to be able to face myself and my children.—Katharina Jacob

Katharina Jacob died in Hamburg in 1989, aged 82. Her elder daughter, Ursel, grew up to become a historian. She has researched the German Resistance for decades and written several books on the subject.

== Memorials ==
In 1992, a street in the Hamburg district of Groß Borstel was named after Katharina Jacob. There is a stolperstein at Jarresstraße 21, where she lived for many years with her two children, and briefly, with her husband, Franz. The song "They All Sang the Internationale" by American political song writer and musician David Rovics tells (part of) her story.

== See also ==
- List of Germans who resisted Nazism
- Resistance during World War II
