= Paul Gesche =

German communist and resistance fighter against Nazism (1907–1944)

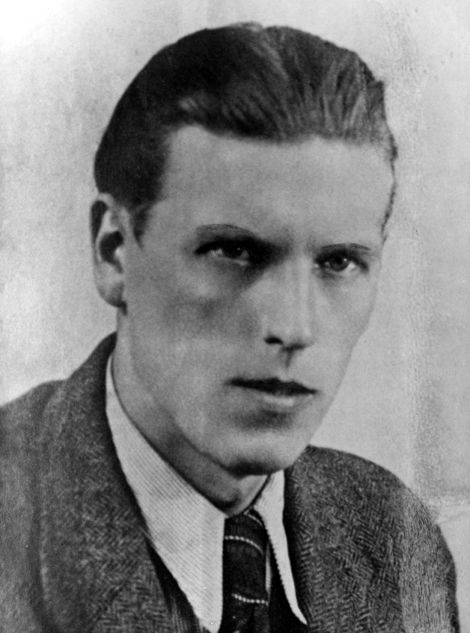
Paul Gesche

Paul Gesche (12 June 1907 – 21 August 1944) was a German communist and resistance fighter against Nazism.

== Biography ==
Gesche was born in Berlin. A carpenter, he was a member of Sozialistische Arbeiter-Jugend from 1924 and joined the Communist Party of Germany (KPD) in 1931. When the Nazi Party came to power in 1933, he joined the underground resistance. In 1934, Gesche was arrested, and on 19 January 1935 he was sentenced to one year's imprisonment for "preparation for high treason".

After his release, Gesche joined the resistance group around Robert Uhrig and worked mainly in northern Berlin. On 10 February 1942, he was arrested by the Gestapo. Gesche was imprisoned in Landsberg an der Warthe and Sachsenhausen concentration camp before being sentenced to death for treason by the People's Court on 6 June 1944. He was executed by hanging in Brandenburg-Görden Prison on 21 August 1944.

A street in Berlin, Paul-Gesche-Straße, was named after him in 1976.
