= Wilhelm Rietze =

German communist and resistance fighter against Nazism (1903–1944)

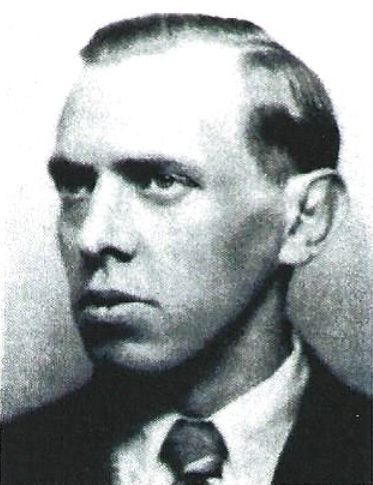
Wilhelm Rietze

Wilhelm Rietze (10 October 1903 – 28 August 1944) was a German communist and resistance fighter against Nazism.

== Biography ==
Rietze was born in Berlin-Köpenick. A metal worker by profession, he was at first a member of the German Metal Workers' Union and then joined the Revolutionäre Gewerkschafts Opposition. He was a member of the Communist Party of Germany (KPD) from 1930, and also active in the workers' sports club "Nordwest".

When the Nazi Party came to power in 1933, Rietze continued working for the underground KPD. On 29 January 1934 he was arrested by the Gestapo and interned in Columbia concentration camp; Rietze was sentenced to three years' imprisonment on 1 November 1934, which he served in Luckau prison.

After his release, Rietze joined the resistance group around Robert Uhrig. However, he was arrested again on 4 February 1942 and spent more than two years in Sachsenhausen concentration camp before being tried and sentenced to death by the People's Court on 6 July 1944. He was executed by guillotine on 28 August 1944 in Brandenburg-Görden Prison.

A street in the Prenzlauer Berg borough of Berlin, Rietzestraße, was named after Rietze on 30 January 1952.
