= Walter Hochmuth =

German politician and diplomat

Walter Hochmuth (born 14 February 1904 in Reichenbach im Vogtland, died 28 December 1979 in Berlin) was a German politician in the Weimar Republic (KPD), resistance fighter during the Nazi regime and a diplomat of East Germany.

== From childhood to the Weimar Republic ==
Walter Hochmuth was born the ninth of ten children of a railway official. His father, Karl Hochmuth, was a conductor on the Saxon Railway. His mother Selma, née Schramm, was a crank embroiderer. He attended the eight-year elementary and civil school and then trade school. In 1920, he began an apprenticeship as a clerk in the Tuchfabrik Albert Greiner (Albert Greiner AG cloth factory). At the same time he joined the Gewerkschaftsbund der Angestellten (Trade Union Federation of Employees, GdA) and within a short time became chairman of its youth federation.

In 1922, he moved to Düsseldorf, and a little later to Cologne, and worked as a cashier and salesman in the cloth wholesale business of Hugo Braunstein AG. In Cologne, too, he was a member of the local youth group of the GdA, which was very sympathetic to the KJVD and was therefore expelled from the GdA in 1924. The group then became the Wanderbund „Florian Geyer“ (“Florian Geyer” hiking association). Since Hochmuth had been a member of the KJVD and the KPD since May 1, 1925, he was transferred to the Hamburg branch of the Tuchhaus Paul Peininger GmbH in 1926, where he later became union chairman. There he was married in 1927 to Katharina Emmermann, their daughter Ursel Hochmuth was born in 1931.

The year 1931 was also a year with important events in other regards. On the one hand, Hochmuth was expelled from the union, on the other hand he was elected to the Hamburg Parliament as the youngest member of the KPD. His employer fired him and he began a traineeship at the Hamburger Volkszeitung. In the district leadership of the KPD he was also responsible for the work among the employees. In this function he was involved, among other things, in the establishment of a club for employees at the Gänsemarkt. In 1932, Hochmuth took part in the 3rd Reich Conference of the KPD in Berlin.

== Time of National Socialism: illegality, escape, emigration, imprisonment ==
After the Nazis seized power, Hochmuth was wanted by the police and had to go underground. Nevertheless, he was a member of the illegal leadership of the KPD until August 1934. He continued to write for the now illegal Hamburger Volkszeitung and worked with Albert Bennies in the district leadership of the Revolutionäre Gewerkschafts Opposition (RGO), where he published the RGO newspaper Der Klassengewerkschafter. He began a love affair with one of his lodgers, the tailor's assistant Renate Brake, which resulted in their son Peter in March 1934. After Bennies and other comrades were arrested, Hochmuth fled to Denmark with Brake's help. There he came into conflict with the emigration leadership of the KPD and had to move his exile to Amsterdam in 1935 by decision of the party.

Hochmuth stowed away on a cargo ship from Denmark to Antwerp. Brake and his son Peter followed him to the Netherlands. In 1938, Hochmuth was stripped of his German citizenship and deported from the Netherlands to Belgium as an "undesirable person" after he had already been interned from March to June of that year. In Belgium, too, he lived illegally with communist miners' families without valid identification papers. In March, their daughter Birgid was born in Charleroi. After Germany's invasion of Belgium, Hochmuth was interned. In May 1940 he was transported by freight wagon to the Gurs internment camp in southern France and interned there.

After the German troops had also occupied southern France, Hochmuth was arrested by the Gestapo (via Wehrmacht) and imprisoned in the Fuhlsbüttel police prison in March 1943. In Germany he was in custody by the Gestapo until January 1944, then in judicial custody, and finally on July 21 the People's Court in Potsdam sentenced him to five years in prison for "preparing to commit high treason". After his first marriage ended in divorce in 1939, Hochmuth married Renate Brake in January 1944. Franz Jacob married his first wife Katharina, who also lived with their daughter Ursel. In 1945 he was liberated by the Red Army along with other prisoners from the Brandenburg Prison.

== Career in East Germany ==
In May 1945, Hochmuth became head of the personnel department of the Post and Telecommunications Department of the Greater Berlin Municipality. Shortly thereafter he fetched his wife and children from Reichenbach, where they had found shelter with his brother Rudolf Hochmuth. In 1947 he became Head of Human Resources in the Post and Telecommunications Department of the German Economic Commission (DWK). He was also one of the founding members of the postal and telecommunications industrial union and was a member of its central board. After the president of the Oberpostdirektion Schwerin had fled to the western zones, Hochmuth was removed from the personnel manager function "due to a lack of vigilance" and became an procurator at the Deutsche Handelsgesellschaft in March 1949, and in 1950 finally group leader in the GDR government chancellery, main office administration. From 1949 he lived in Woltersdorf, Brandenburg, where he was chairman of the Main Committee of the National Front. At this time he began distance learning at the Deutsche Akademie für Staats- und Rechtswissenschaft „Walter Ulbricht“ (German Academy for Political Science and Law "Walter Ulbricht"). He completed it with the state examination.

From April 1956 Hochmuth was deputy head and from 1957 head of the East German trade mission (Commercial attaché) in Jakarta, Indonesia. From 1959 to 1962 he was a Legationsrat (legation counselor) in Iraq, from June 1962 until his return due to illness in 1963 as Consul General in Baghdad. Among other things, he was involved in setting up the GDR embassy in Iraq. He was thus the first representative of the GDR in a non-socialist country. In 1964, Hochmuth moved to the Ministry of the Interior and was initially deputy head of the Deutsches Zentralarchiv (DZA) (the East German Central Archives) in Potsdam. After a lengthy illness, in 1965 he succeeded Karl Schirdewan as head of the State Archives Administration in Potsdam, where he also lived in the meantime. Hochmuth had been a pensioner since 1968. In the last years of his life he was chairman of the Potsdam district committee of the anti-fascist resistance fighters in the GDR.

In addition to other awards, Hochmuth received the Vaterländischer Verdienstorden in silver in 1960 and in gold in 1974, and in 1979 the clasp of honor for the Patriotic Order of Merit.

Hochmuth's grave can be found in the "Pergolenweg" grave complex of the Gedenkstätte der Sozialisten (Socialist Memorial) at the Zentralfriedhof Friedrichsfelde (Friedrichsfelde Central Cemetery), where he is buried alongside his wife.

== Publications ==
- Das Personalwesen der Deutschen Post in der sowjetischen Besatzungszone, Deutscher Zentralverlag, Berlin 1948.
- Brief von Walter Hochmuth aus der Internierungshaft in Merxplas/Belgien an seine Tochter Ursel vom 31. März 1940, In: Was bleibt ist Hoffnung. Eine Briefdokumentation aus Brandenburger Konzentrationslagern, Zuchthäusern und Gefängnissen der NS-Zeit 1933-1945, Brandenburgische Landeszentrale für Politische Bildung, Potsdam 1994, p. 104f.
