= Harry Seidel =

East German cyclist (1938–2020)

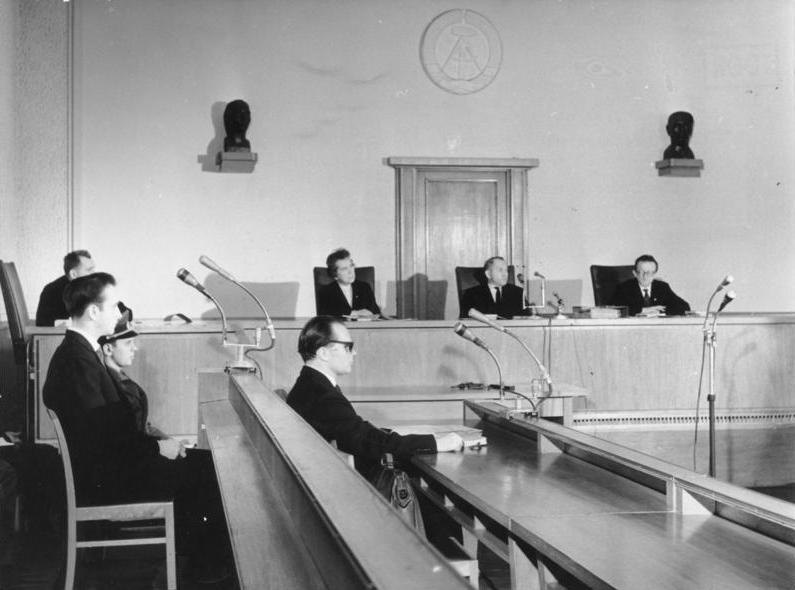
Seidel in court

Harry Seidel (April 2, 1938 – August 8, 2020) was a German professional cyclist who helped people escape from the German Democratic Republic (GDR) through tunnels in West Berlin. After he got caught in 1962, the highest court under notorious judge Heinrich Toeplitz of the GDR sentenced him to life in prison in a show trial. He was incarcerated at the Brandenburg-Görden Prison. In 1966, the Federal Republic of Germany bought him out of prison.
