= Franz Jacob (resistance fighter) =

German Resistance fighter against Nazism and Communist politician (1906–1944)

Member of the Hamburg Parliament
- In office 24 April 1932 – 28 February 1933

Personal details
- Born: 9 August 1906 Hamburg, German Empire
- Died: 18 September 1944 (aged 38) Brandenburg-Görden Prison, Brandenburg an der Havel, Nazi Germany
- Party: SPD (1920–1925); KPD (after 1925)
- Spouse: Katharina Hochmuth (m. 1941)
- Children: Ilse
- Occupation: Resistance fighter
- Other offices held: 1931–1933: Secretary of Agitation and Propaganda, Wasserkante (Hamburg-Schleswig-Holstein) KPD

Franz Jacob (9 August 1906 – 18 September 1944) was an activist and a Communist politician who participated in the German Resistance against the Nazis.

Jacob grew up in a Social Democratic Party family but aged 19 he joined the Communist Party. He worked as a longshoreman during numerous periods of his life, often organising his fellow workers. In 1932 at the age of 26, Jacob became a member of the Hamburg Parliament. In 1933, the Nazis came to power and the Reichstag was burned down, an event that was blamed on the Communists. Hitler pushed through the Reichstag Fire Decree, which withdrew civil liberties and enabled the Nazis to arrest anyone they deemed to be an enemy, and in effect, outlawed all other political parties in Germany. By the end of April 1933, the Nazis had arrested 18,000 Communists and Jacob was forced underground. He was arrested in August 1933 in Berlin and sent to prison, where he was tortured and, in 1934, was sentenced to three years hard labor. In 1940, Jacob was released and joined the resistance. In he, Jacob was involved in the 20 July plot to assassinate Hitler. The group were denounced by an informer and when Jacob and others arrived at the appointed place, they were caught by the Gestapo. Jacob was sentenced to death and executed on 18 September 1944.

== Early life and education ==
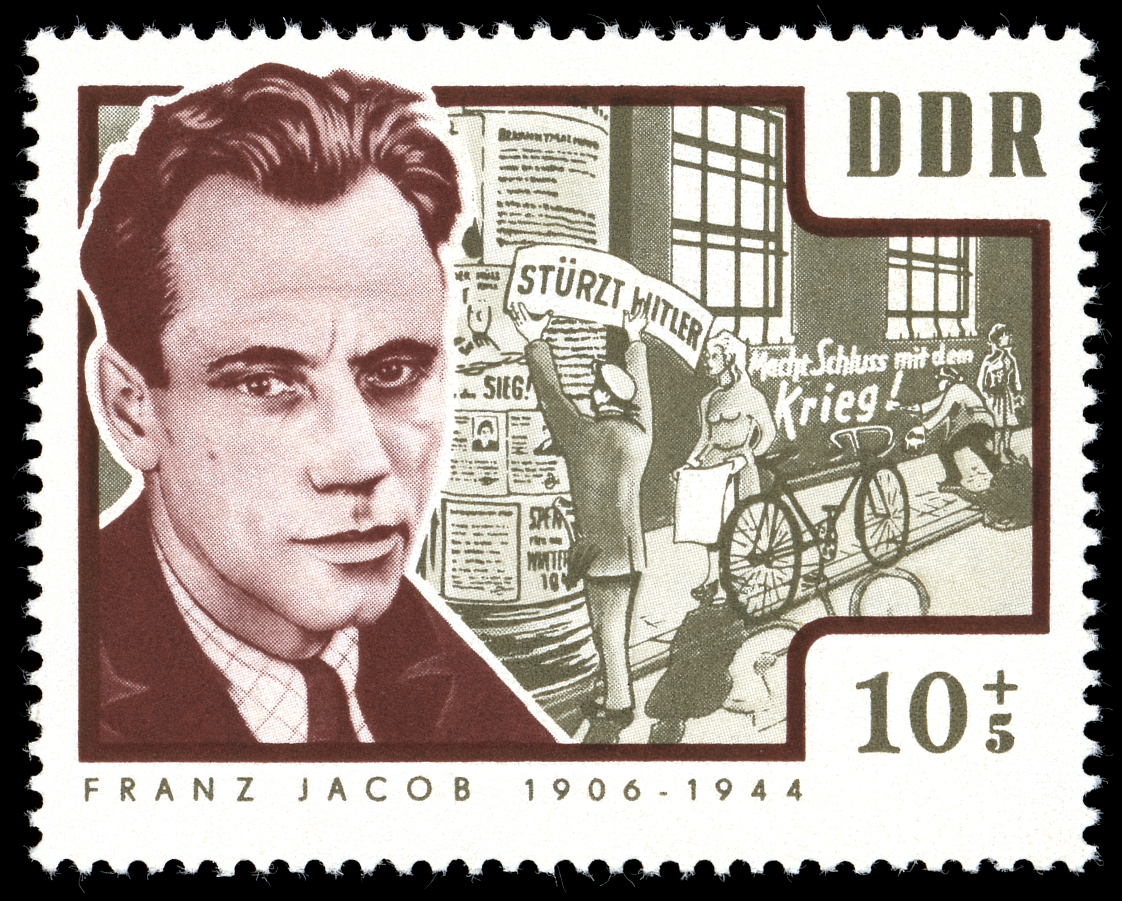
Franz Jacob, 1964 stamp from the DDR

Jacob was born in Hamburg in a working-class family. His mother, Marie Pgetz, was a maid and his father, August Moser, was a house servant, who died young. His family lived with his grandfather, an active member of the Social Democratic Party of Germany (SPD) until his mother remarried in 1917. Her new husband, Gustav Jacob, adopted Franz.

Jacob only attended one year of secondary school. He then learned the trade of machine fitting on Hamburg wharfs and joined the metalworkers' union, where he was elected representative of the apprentices.

== Career ==
The First World War and the economic situation in Germany prompted Jacob to join the youth branch of the Social Democratic Party of Germany in 1920, at the age of 14. A year later, he joined the SPD. In 1925, he left the SPD for the youth group of the Communist Party of Germany (KPD), over the objections of family.

He also joined the Rote Hilfe and the Rote Frontkämpferbund (RFB). His activity in the Communist Youth group, led to him being elected the organization leader of the waterfront district. In 1928, he joined the KPD itself and was allowed to be a delegate to the 5th International Congress of Communist Youth and the 6th World Congress of the Communist International, both in Moscow. As a result, Jacob lost his job at the Hamburg Telegraph Office. His next job was at Reiherstieg-Werft, but he was fired without notice after calling for a short strike.

In 1929, Jacob began working as a correspondent for the KPD publications for Hamburg and Schleswig-Holstein, the Hamburger Volkszeitung (Hamburg Peoples' Press) and the Norddeutsche Echo (North German Echo). For a short time, he went to Kiel to help build a new anti-fascist organization to replace the RFB, which had been made illegal. In 1931, he became Secretary for agitation and propaganda for the KPD's Hamburg waterfront district, working then primarily for the KPD. His flyers made his name well known and in April 1932, he became a member of the Hamburg Parliament, at the age of 26.

== Arrest ==
The March 1933 elections saw great gains by the National Socialists to seats of power, both on the state and national level. On 27 February 1933, six days before the election, the Reichstag was burned, an event that was blamed on the Communists. With Nazis in key positions in government, Adolf Hitler was able to push through the Reichstag Fire Decree, which was then signed into law by President Paul von Hindenburg. The decree withdrew civil liberties and enabled the Nazis to arrest anyone they deemed to be an enemy. This became first and foremost a confrontation with the KPD, but in effect, outlawed all political parties in Germany, other than the Nazi Party. The Enabling Act of 27 March 1933 consolidated their power and authority. By the end of April 1933, the Nazis had arrested 18,000 Communists, 12,000 SPD members and others, filling concentration camps. By June 1933, more than half of the KPD's district leaders were in detention and hundreds of Nazi opponents had been killed. Many people went underground, including Jacob.

A year later, in mid-August 1933, he was arrested in Berlin by the Nazis and sent to prison, where Jacob subjected to torture in the Gestapo prisons Columbia Haus in Berlin and KolaFu in Hamburg. In 1934, he was sentenced to three years at hard labor in a Zuchthaus for "preparation to commit high treason. After he had served his sentence, he was sent to Sachsenhausen concentration camp for three years of preventive detention, where he stayed until 1940.

== Resistance ==
Upon his release, he immediately went to Hamburg, where he found work at a shipyard and got back in touch with friends Bernhard Bästlein and Robert Abshagen, with whom he formed the Bästlein-Jacob-Abshagen Group, a Communist resistance group. He again was responsible for agitation and propaganda, producing flyers and other publications. He also began creating an archive for the group, which he conspired with a friend, Otto Gröllmann, who was a set designer at the Thalia Theater (Hamburg) to conceal there. The archive has since been lost.

After a wave of arrests began in Hamburg in October 1942, which included Bästlein and Abshagen, Jacob fled and went to Berlin, where he was again underground. In 1943, he formed another resistance group, this time with Anton Saefkow. Bästlein was able to escape prison during a bombing raid in 1944 and ran into Jacob by chance, after which he joined them in forming the Saefkow-Jacob-Bästlein Organization, also called the "Operative Leadership of the Communist Party in Germany". It was one of the largest resistance groups in Germany. They focused on disseminating information that they were able to glean from foreign newspapers and from radio broadcasts from Moscow.

They also organized the Bewegung Freies Deutschland (Free Germany Movement) to work with people in factories, military units, opposition parties and others, growing to several hundred people. In his publication, Am Beginn der letzten Phase des Krieges ("At the beginning of the last phase of the war"), Jacob wrote that to end the war and overthrow the fascist dictator, Communists should concentrate all their strength "on developing a broad, national front composed of all groups that stand opposed to fascism.

Jacob lived underground in Berlin almost two years, moving frequently, some 30 times in 18 months, and having to remain very quiet during the daytime, so as not to be overheard. Being illegal, meant he also had to sit out bomb raids and dared not seek cover in a bomb shelter.

== Plot to kill Hitler and Jacob's death ==
In April 1944, Social Democrats Adolf Reichwein and Julius Leber, who were members of the Kreisau Circle, got in touch with Saefkow and Jacob to talk about bringing their Communist organization into the conspiracy of the 20 July plot to assassinate Adolf Hitler. This was done with the knowledge and agreement of Claus von Stauffenberg. There was a meeting with Reichwein and Leber on 22 June 1944 in the apartment of Dr Rudolf Schmid. Then Jacob and Leber, who had been together at Sachsenhausen and had formed a good trust with one another, met again, separately. According to historian Peter Steinbach, they knew this military resistance was an effort without a broad foundation of support and that the leaders of the SPD and KPD, as well as trade unions, had the contacts to turn it into an act of resistance with support.

An additional meeting was planned for 4 July 1944 to discuss concrete measures. They were denounced by an informer, however, and when Jacob, Saefkow and Reichwein arrived at the appointed place, the Gestapo snared them all. Leber was arrested a few days later. Jacob was sentenced to death by the Volksgerichtshof on 5 September 1944 and was executed on 18 September 1944, at Brandenburg-Görden Prison, along with Saefkow and Bästlein.

== Personal life ==
Jacob married Katharina Hochmuth (née Emmermann), whom he had known from the Young Communist League. He moved in with her and her daughter, Ursel. Katharina was also politically active and had already been in concentration camps more than once and had served a year in prison. She helped Jacob gather information for his flyers, which were smuggled to Berlin by courier Charlotte Groß.

After Jacob was forced to flee to Berlin in October 1942, it was Charlotte Groß who brought him news of the birth of his daughter, Ilse, who was born on 9 November 1942. Jacob saw his daughter just once, when Katharina and her children were on a trip and on the way home, secretly spent one night in Berlin.

Jacob's wife survived the war and became involved in the Union of Persecutees of the Nazi Regime. Years later, she was asked if her fight against Adolf Hitler had been worth it.

55 million people in Germany and Europe were wiped out; gassed, fallen on the front lines, died where they lived. Should one not ask here if their deaths had any purpose? ... The Resistance fighters put their lives on the line for humanity and peace. My husband fell on this front. I also followed my conscience and convictions. The decision was not easy. But to see wrong and do nothing about it? I had to be able to face myself and my children.

— Katharina Jacob

Historian and author Ursel Hochmuth (born 1931), daughter of Katharina and Franz Jacob's stepdaughter, has researched the German Resistance for decades and written several books on the subject.

== Legacy ==
The Lichtenberg suburb of Berlin named a street named after Franz Jacob in 1975. There is also a street in Rostock named for Jacob. There is a commemorative plaque for Franz Jacob at Jarrestraße 21, in Hamburg, where he lived with his wife and family.

== See also ==
- List of Germans who resisted Nazism
- Resistance during World War II
