= Saefkow-Jacob-Bästlein Organization =

German underground resistance movement

The Saefkow-Jacob-Bästlein Organization was an underground German resistance movement acting during the Second World War, that published the illegal magazine, Die Innere Front ("The Internal Front").

In the 1940s, the Communist Party of Germany, with support from the Soviet Union, tried to work underground to build an "operative leadership". It was particularly active in 1943 and 1944 and was one of the largest groups in the German resistance against the National Socialist state. Its hub was in Berlin. Many of its members were arrested by the Gestapo in 1944 and later killed.

== Organization and its goals ==
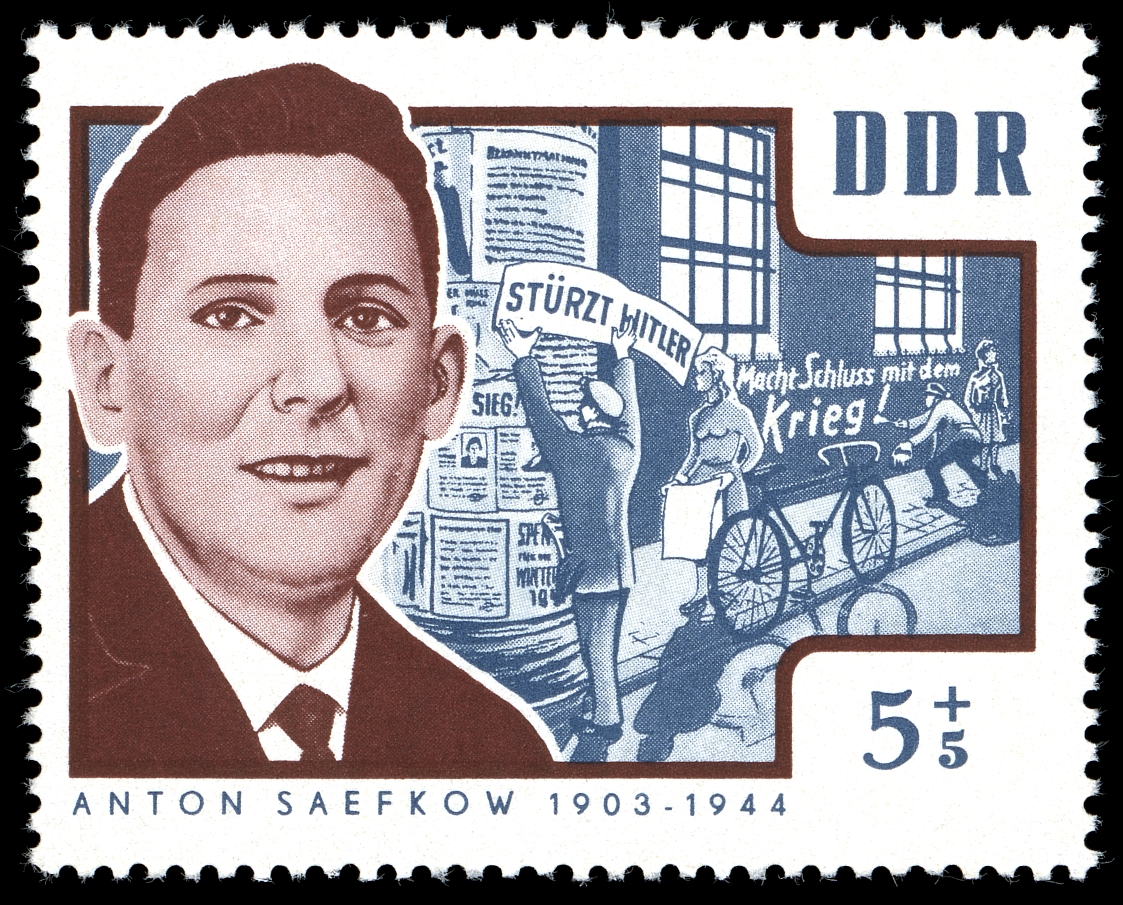
Anton Saefkow, 1964 stamp from the GDR

In 1939, after Communist Party official Anton Saefkow was released after having been arrested, he resumed his illegal work. After the arrest of members of the Robert Uhrig Group in February 1942 and of the group around Wilhelm Guddorf and John Sieg in autumn 1942, Saefkow and Franz Jacob, who had fled Hamburg to Berlin after a wave of arrests, began building a new resistance network of illegal cells in the factories of Berlin.

An air raid on Plötzensee Prison in Berlin made it possible for Bernhard Bästlein to escape in January 1944. He ran into Jacob by chance, after which he joined them in forming the Saefkow-Jacob-Bästlein Organization. It was one of the larger resistance groups in Germany. They focused on disseminating information that they were able to glean from foreign newspapers and from radio broadcasts from Moscow.

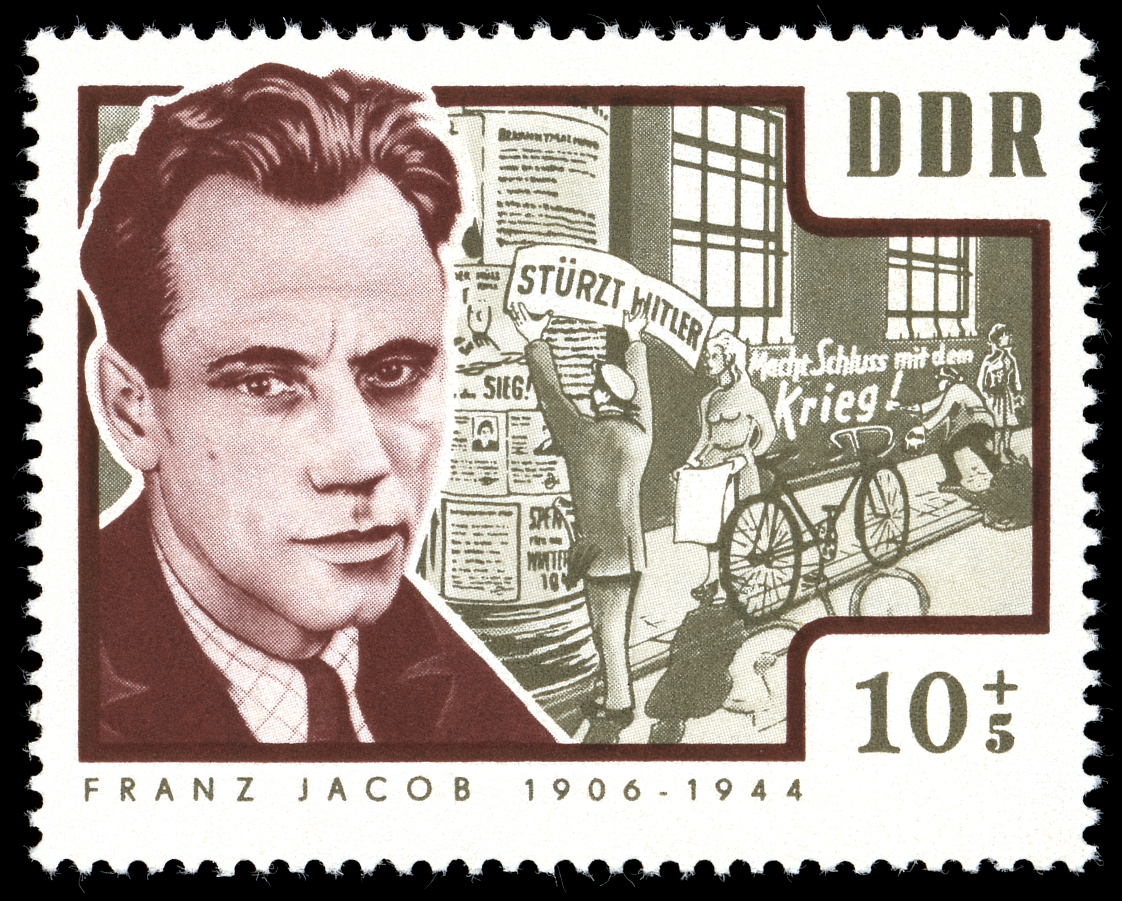
Franz Jacob, 1964 stamp from the GDR

They also organized the Bewegung Freies Deutschland (Free Germany Movement) to work with people in factories, military units, opposition parties and others, growing to several hundred people. In his publication, Am Beginn der letzten Phase des Krieges ("At the beginning of the last phase of the war"), Jacob wrote that to end the war and overthrow the fascist dictator, Communists should concentrate all their strength "on developing a broad, national front composed of all groups that stand opposed to fascism.

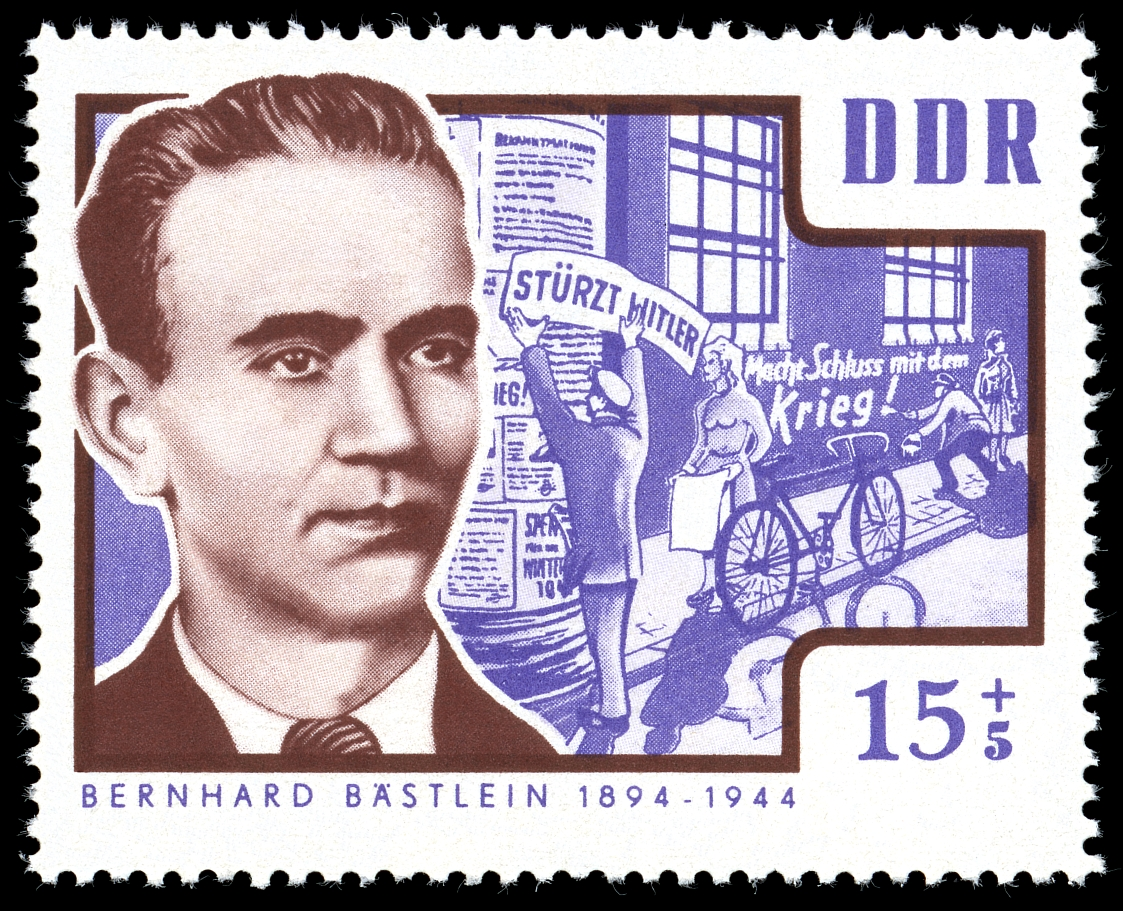
Bernhard Bästlein, 1964 stamp from the GDR

The goal was to give the splintered resistance a central leadership. Together with Bästlein and Jacob, Saefkow formed the head of the organization, later also known as the "Operative Leadership of the Communist Party in Germany". There were strong links to other resistance groups in many of the bigger German cities, such as Magdeburg, Leipzig, Dresden and Hamburg. The plan was to build a united front, with anti-fascist circles of the Social Democrats and the middle class, that would topple Adolf Hitler through sabotage and other acts. The 500 members of the Saefkow-Jacob-Bästlein group, one of the biggest resistance groups in Germany, included not just workers, but doctors, teachers, engineers and artists. About one-quarter of the members were women. The largest factory group of the organization was at Teves, a machine and tool manufacturer, with about 40 members (a very small percentage of their roughly 2,400 employees). A plaque there now honors their memory. (See photo, below.)

Following a betrayal in 1944, over 280 members of the organization were arrested. Of that number, 104 either perished in concentration camps or were executed by the Nazis.

== Betrayal and arrest ==
In April 1944, Social Democrats Adolf Reichwein and Julius Leber, who were members of the Kreisau Circle, got in touch with Saefkow and Jacob to talk about bringing their Communist organization into the conspiracy of the 20 July plot to assassinate Adolf Hitler. This was done with the knowledge and agreement of Claus von Stauffenberg. There was a meeting with Reichwein and Leber on June 22, 1944 in the apartment of Dr. Rudolf Schmid. Jacob and Leber, who had been together at Sachsenhausen concentration camp and had formed a good trust with one another, then met again, separately. According to historian Peter Steinbach, they knew that this military resistance was an effort without a broad foundation of support and they, as leaders of the Social Democratic Party of Germany (SPD) and the KPD, as well as trade unions, had the contacts to make this act of resistance without broad support into an act of resistance with support.

An additional meeting was planned for July 4, 1944 to discuss concrete measures. They were denounced by an informer, however, and when Jacob, Saefkow and Reichwein arrived at the appointed place, the Gestapo arrested them all. Leber was arrested a few days later. Bästlein had already been arrested again on May 30, 1944. Saefkow, Jacob and Bästlein were all sentenced to death by the Volksgerichtshof on September 5, 1944 and were executed on September 18, 1944, at Brandenburg-Görden Prison.

== Fatherless families ==
Saefkow left behind a wife and two daughters. Shortly before his death, he wrote to his wife Änne: "Through this letter I want to thank you, my comrade, for the greatness and beauty that you have given me in our life together... Not till today, writing these lines, thinking about you all, have my eyes moistened since the sentencing. For the pain, which might tear me apart, restrains reason. You know, I am militant and shall die bravely. I only ever wanted good..."

Saefkow's daughter, Dr. Bärbel Schindler-Saefkow is one of the curators of a traveling exhibition about the Saefkow-Jacob-Bästlein Organization called "Berlin Workers' Resistance 1942-1945" which is expected to travel to the United States in 2010.

Jacob left behind a wife, Katharina Jacob and two children, a step-daughter, Ursel Hochmuth (b. 1931), and daughter Ilse (b. 1942). Jacob saw Ilse just once, when Katharina took a trip with her children and stopped in Berlin, secretly staying with her husband one night. Dr. Ursel Hochmuth now a historian and author, has researched the German Resistance for decades and written several books on the subject.

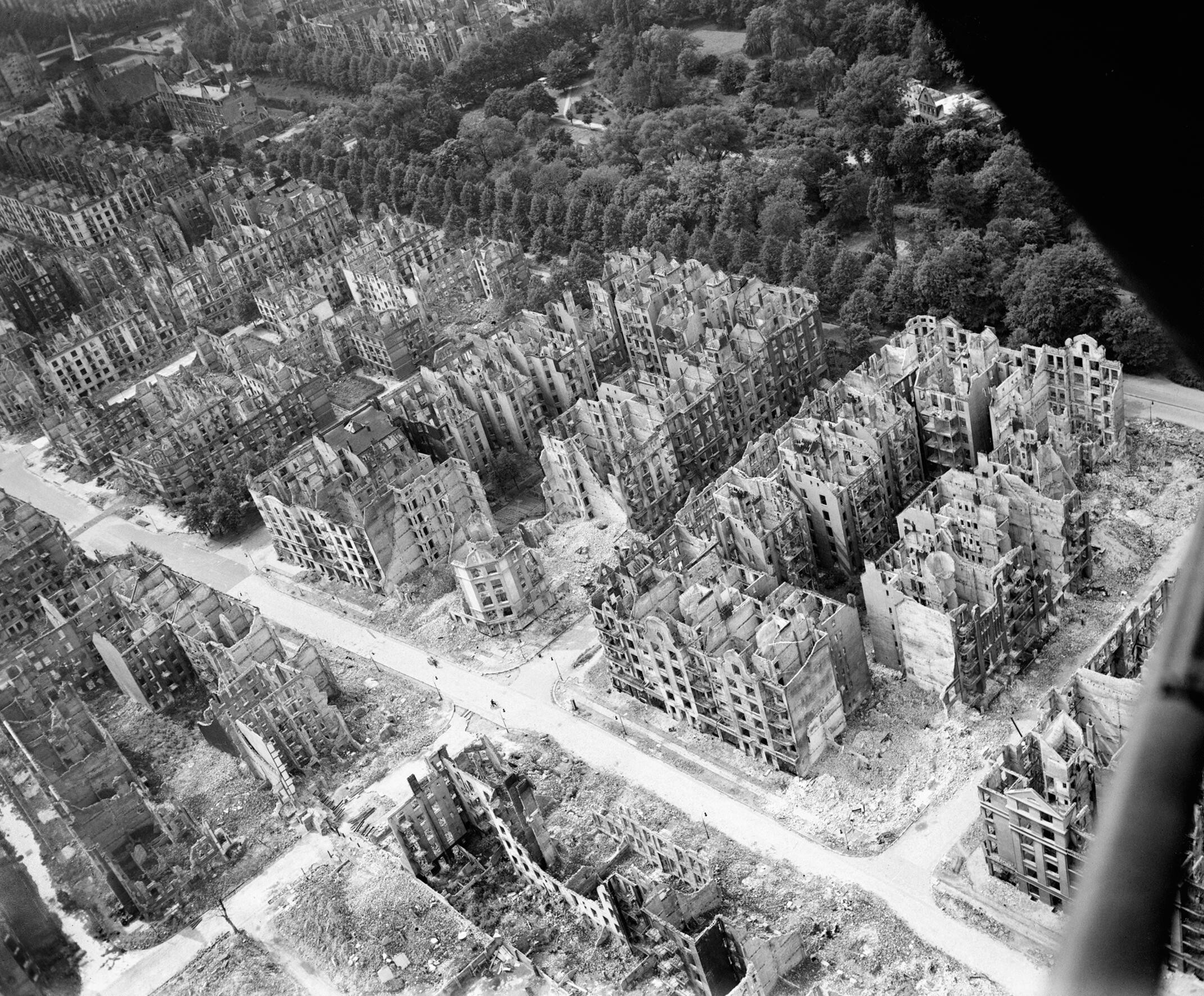
Aerial photo of Hamburg after the 1943 bombing campaign

Bästlein left behind a wife, Johanna Bästlein and a son, Bernt Henry Jürgen (b. 1932). His wife was also a Communist and suffered hardships as a result. After the Nazis came to power in 1933, they had to vacate their home of two years. Her husband under arrest, she put their belongings in storage, but never received those items again. She and son moved to Hamburg, where she lived from social welfare, which was cut off in 1938. Thereafter, she earned a living as a seamstress. In 1943, Hamburg was the target of severe bombing and they lost their home in July, after which they lived in a primitive arbor. She was arrested twice, but was released due to lack of evidence. She didn't find out about her husband's execution until September 30, 1944.

== Memorials ==
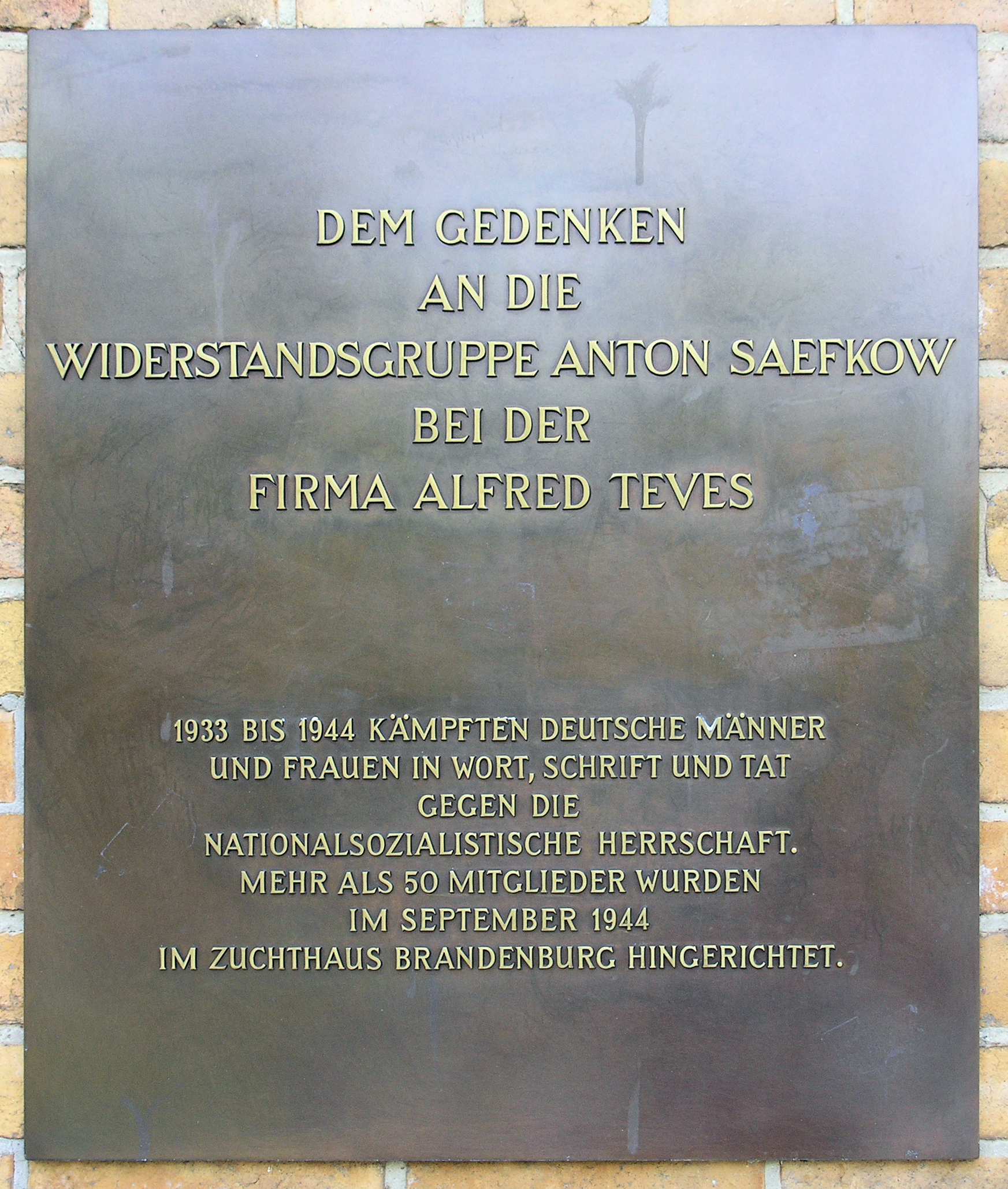
Memorial plaque for the Saefkow-Jacob-Bästlein Organization in Berlin

The German Democratic Republic (GDR) issued stamps in 1964, on the 20th anniversary of the deaths of Saefkow, Jacob and Bästlein.

A memorial plaque honoring the work of Saefkow and those who worked with him is located at Hermsdorfer Straße 14 in Berlin. The plaque says, "In memorial to the resistance group Anton Saefkow, at the Alfred Teves Company. From 1933 to 1944, German men and women fought in word and deed against the National Socialist regime. In September 1944, more than 50 members were executed at Brandenburg Prison."

Berlin has streets named for both Bernhard Bästlein and Franz Jacob and a square named after Anton Saefkow. There is also a street named for Saefkow in Prenzlauer Berg.

Both Jacob and Bästlein have stolpersteine in Hamburg.

== Bibliography ==
- Annette Neumann, Susanne Reveles, Bärbel Schindler-Saefkow. Berliner Arbeiterwiderstand 1942–1945. „Weg mit Hitler – Schluß mit dem Krieg!“ Die Saefkow-Jacob-Bästlein-Organisation. Berlin Vereinigung der Verfolgten des Naziregimes – Bund der Antifaschisten und Antifaschistinnen e.V., (2009) (in German)
- Günther Weisenborn (Ed.). Der lautlose Widerstand. Bericht über die Widerstandsbewegung des deutschen Volkes 1933-1945. Rowohlt, Hamburg (1953) (in German)
- Hermann Weber (historian). Die Wandlung des deutschen Kommunismus. Band 2, Frankfurt a.M., 1969 (in German)
- Emil Rudolf Greulich. Keiner wird als Held geboren. Berlin: Verlag Neues Leben, 1961 (in German)
- Holtmann, Karen (2010). Die Saefkow-Jacob-Bästlein-Gruppe vor dem Volksgerichtshof: die Hochverratsverfahren gegen die Frauen und Männer der Berliner Widerstandsorganisation 1944-1945 (in German). Paderborn: Schöningh. doi:10.30965/9783657769315. ISBN 978-3-506-76931-2. OCLC 1266653698.
- Ursel Hochmuth. Illegale KPD und Bewegung "Freies Deutschland" in Berlin und Brandenburg 1942 - 1945. Biographien und Zeugnisse aus der Widerstandsorganisation um Saefkow, Jacob und Bästlein. (Schriften der Gedenkstätte Deutscher Widerstand. Reihe A, Analysen und Darstellungen, Band 4); Hentrich und Hentrich. Teetz (1998) ISBN 3-933471-08-7 (in German)

== See also ==
- List of Germans who resisted Nazism
- People of the Saefkow-Jacob-Bästlein Organization
- Resistance during World War II
