= Werner-Seelenbinder-Halle =

Indoor sporting arena in Berlin, Germany

Coordinates: 52°31′52″N 13°26′58″E

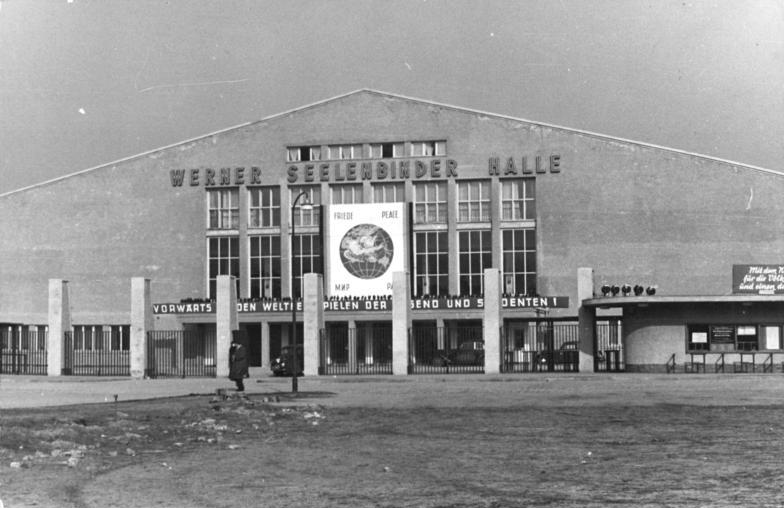
The Werner-Seelenbinder-Halle prior to the 1951 World Festival of Youth and Students

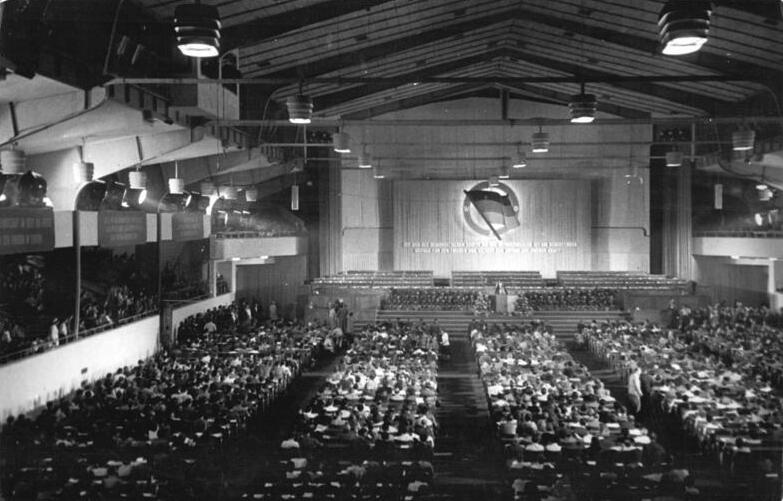
26 August 1950: National Front congress

Werner-Seelenbinder-Halle was an indoor sporting arena located in the Prenzlauer Berg district of Berlin, Germany. It was named after the executed Berlin resistance fighter Werner Seelenbinder, a German wrestling champion at several European championships who also competed at the 1936 Summer Olympics.

The arena opened in 1950 in what was then East Berlin, in a converted hall that had been part of the central cattle market and slaughterhouse complex. It then hosted the first national meeting of the Free German Youth. One of the major sports venues in Berlin in the 20th century, the capacity of the arena was up to 10,000 people.

Until the opening of the Palast der Republik in 1976, East German mass organizations like the Socialist Unity Party of Germany (SED) regularly used the Werner-Seelenbinder-Halle as a convention hall. From 1970 to 1990, it was also the site of the annual Festival of Political Songs. On 7 March 1988, Depeche Mode made their East German debut here, followed by The Wedding Present and Jonathan Richman but also by Feeling B and Rio Reiser in the same year.

Werner-Seelenbinder-Halle was closed and demolished in 1993. It was replaced by the present-day Velodrom.
