= Wolfgang Kusserow =

Victim of the Holocaust (1922–1942)

- Born: 1 March 1922; Bochum, Germany
- Died: 10 March 1942 (aged 20); Brandenburg-Görden Prison
- Parent(s): Franz Karl Paul Kusserow and Hilda Kusserow

Wolfgang Kusserow (1 March 1922 – 28 March 1942) was executed by guillotine at Brandenburg-Görden Prison for conscientiously objecting induction into the German Army because of his religious beliefs as a Jehovah's Witness.

One of his older brothers, Wilhelm Kusserow, had similarly been executed on 27 April 1940 for refusing conscription on grounds of his faith.

== Family ==
Kusserow was one of eleven children born to Franz Karl Paul Kusserow and Hilda Kusserow in Bochum, Germany, a family of Jehovah's Witnesses that were persecuted for their religion during the Nazi regime.

Annemarie Kusserow, one of Wilhelm and Wolfgang's sisters, preserved a 1000-piece archive documenting the persecution of the family by the Nazi regime. In defiance of her will, the Bundeswehr Military History Museum in Dresden, Germany, continues to hold the archive. She had left the archive to the Jehovah's Witnesses in her will.
