= Bernhard Schwentner =

German Catholic clergyman (1891–1944)

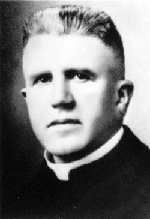
Bernhard Schwentner.

Bernhard Schwentner (28 September 1891 in Schwerin – 30 October 1944 near Brandenburg-Görden) was a German Catholic clergyman.

== Life ==
Bernhard Schwentner was born in Schwerin in 1891. After finishing Gymnasium, he studied in Münster beginning in 1910. In 1913, he entered the seminary in Osnabrück, and was ordained a priest in 1914. Until he was called into the military, Schwentner worked at the St.-Ansgar-Kirche/Kleiner Michel in Hamburg as a vicar and a teacher. In World War I, he was a chaplain and, as an added responsibility, garrison clergyman at Neustrelitz. In the time from April 1917 to December 1918, he was posted to the front as a chaplain. Finally, he worked again in Hamburg as a chaplain, before he went to Rome in 1924 to study Church law. He graduated with a doctorate in philosophy and canonical law.

From 1927, Schwentner was the priest in the Catholic parish of Neustrelitz, and chairman of the conference of priests for Mecklenburg. The respectable clergyman viewed the Nazis' rise to power with wariness and scepticism.

Schwentner met often with his officer friends from the Rechlin airbase, but in 1944, he was denounced by at least one of them to the Gestapo. On 15 September 1944, he was sentenced to death by the Volksgerichtshof for undermining the troops' fighting spirit (Wehrkraftzersetzung), and on 30 October 1944, Bernhard Schwentner was put to death. The urn containing his ashes was buried in Neustrelitz on 26 November 1949.

After the war, many streets were named after Schwentner in places such as Hamburg, Schwerin and the last place where he worked, Neustrelitz. In 1965, a memorial to Bernhard Schwentner was built next to the Neustrelitz Catholic Church. It had on it a bronze portrait of Schwentner with a thorny wreath, and it contained the urn with his ashes. The Church has since altered the monument. In the Catholic Church, he is regarded as a martyr.

== Bibliography ==
- U. v. Hehl: Priester unter Hitlers Terror, Mainz (1984)
- B. M. Kempner: Priester vor Hitlers Tribunal, Kirchenbote des Bistums Osnabrück, (November 3, 1946)
- Zur Erinnerung an Pfarrer Bernhard Schwentner, Kirchenbote des Bistums Osnabrück, Nr. 31 (October 1960)
- RSHA-Report, Amt IV (October 21, 1943)
- J. Torsy: Der Große Namenstagskalender, Freiburg-Basel-Wien (1992)
- K. H. Jahnke: Gegen Hitler: Gegner und Verfolgte des NS-Regimes in Mecklenburg 1933-1945
