= Gesche Würfel =

German-American artist (born 1976)

- Born: 1976 (age 49–50); Bremen, Germany
- Occupations: urban planner and sociologist

Gesche Würfel (born 1976) is a visual artist born in Bremerhaven, Germany, and based in the United States since 2009. Her practice mostly focuses on photography, but also includes video, sound, installation, and urban interventions.

== Education ==
Würfel received an MFA from the University of North Carolina, Chapel Hill, North Carolina, United States in 2015. She also received a Masters of Arts in Photography and Urban Cultures from Goldsmiths, University of London in London, England, UK in 2006, after earning her diploma in Spatial Planning from the Technical University of Dortmund in Germany in 2003.

== Artwork ==
Würfel's background as an urban planner and sociologist has greatly influenced her artwork, as has living in Germany, the United Kingdom, and presently in the United States. Her work investigates the relationship between people and place, focusing on how humans interact with their environment in urban spaces, and in cultural and natural landscapes. Würfel's photography engages with the socio-political implications of spatial processes by exploring notions of geography, history, race, class, and gender. Though the majority of her photographs do not include people in particular, they still reflect traces where people have left behind using or passing through these spaces, by photographing unusual and overlooked areas with hidden histories. Recent works by Würfel have concentrated on memory and trauma.

== Career ==
Gesche Würfel is currently based in North Carolina, where she works as a Teaching Assistant Professor at the University of North Carolina at Chapel Hill.

Her work has been exhibited internationally at venues including the Contemporary Art Museum of Raleigh (CAM) in Raleigh, NC, the Massachusetts Institute of Technology (MIT), Cambridge, Massachusetts; Klompching Gallery, New York, NY, US; the Tate Modern, London, UK; Goldsmiths University of London, London, UK; Cornerhouse, Manchester, UK; and the Kokerei Zollverein in Essen, Germany. Würfel's most recent exhibitions include solo shows of her projects “What Remains of the Day – Memories of World War II” at the Pensacola Museum of Art, Pensacola, FL, US and “At the Hands of Persons Unknown” at the Center for Photography at Woodstock (CPW), Woodstock, NY, US.

She has received grants from the Puffin Foundation, the University of North Carolina at Chapel Hill, and the Lower Manhattan Cultural Council (LMCC) among others.

Würfel was named as the Juror's Pick for the LensCulture Emerging Talent Awards in 2016, was a finalist in 2017 and 2018 for the Lange-Taylor Award, and was a Top 50 Critical Mass winner in 2017.

She is also the author of ‘Basement Sanctuaries’ (Schilt Publishing 2014). Würfel's work has been published in The New York Times, The Guardian, LENSCRATCH, ARTCO, Art Actuel, Stadtbauwelt, and many other outlets.
