= Robert Uhrig =

German communist and resistance fighter (1903–1944)

- Robert Uhrig
- Robert Uhrig
- Born: March 8, 1903; Leipzig, Germany
- Died: August 21, 1944 (aged 41); Brandenburg-Görden Prison
- Cause of death: Guillotine
- Occupation: Toolmaker
- Years active: 1920-1944
- Organization: Robert Uhrig Group
- Known for: Anti-Nazi activism
- Political party: Communist Party of Germany
- Movement: German Resistance
- Criminal penalty: Execution
- Spouse: Charlotte Uhrig

Robert Uhrig (German pronunciation: [ˈʁoːbɛʁt ˈʔuːʁɪç]; March 8, 1903 – August 21, 1944) was a German communist and resistance fighter against National Socialism.

== Background ==
Born in Leipzig, the son of a metalworker, Uhrig grew up to become a journeyman toolmaker. He joined the Communist Party of Germany (KPD) in 1920 and took several courses at the Marxist Workers' School. From 1929 on, he worked at Osram in Berlin-Moabit and joined the KPD workplace cell. By the end of 1932, The KPD was the third largest party in Germany, with 3,600,000 members and had received some six million votes in the previous election. He took leadership of the cell in 1933.

== Legality rescinded ==
The Reichstag Fire Decree pushed by Adolf Hitler in response to the Reichstag fire on February 27, 1933, and signed into law by President Paul von Hindenburg withdrew civil liberties and enabled the Nazis, then in key positions in government, to arrest anyone they deemed to be an enemy. This became first and foremost a confrontation with the KPD, but in effect, outlawed all political parties in Germany other than the Nazi Party. The Enabling Act of March 27, 1933, consolidated their power and authority. In the first weeks of March 1933, there were 11,000 Communists arrested and by June 1933, more than half of the KPD district leaders were in detention.

== Arrest and further resistance ==
Uhrig was arrested by the Gestapo in 1934 and sentenced to hard labor at the Zuchthaus in Luckau. After his release in summer 1936, he went underground, working in the leadership of the Berlin KPD. Starting in 1938, he led a network of resistance groups in over 20 factories in Berlin, which became part of one of the largest anti-fascist resistance organizations in Berlin. Through his relationships with Wilhelm Guddorf, John Sieg and others, he was in regular contact with the Red Orchestra and with groups in Hamburg, Mannheim, Leipzig, Munich and elsewhere. Starting in 1940-1941, he also worked extensively with Beppo Römer. Around this period, he was regarded as the leader of KPD resistance in Berlin.

In 1941, Charlotte Bischoff came to Germany by freight ship, entering illegally and bringing instructions from the International Relations department of the Communist International. She worked with the group around Uhrig and with others, such as the Saefkow-Jacob-Bästlein Organization and Kurt and Elisabeth Schumacher. Acting as a courier, she gave "micro materials" to contact people within these groups.

Uhrig and Römer published an underground paper, called Informationdienst ("Information Service"), one of the most important Resistance newspapers. Issued regularly, it endeavored to report on the economic and military situation. It also called for acts of sabotage. The goal of the group was to establish a socialist state after the fall of Hitler's dictatorship. Werner Seelenbinder worked part-time with the Uhrig Group. Other members of the group were Ernst Knaack, Paul Schultz-Liebisch and Charlotte Eisenblätter.

== Arrest and sentence ==
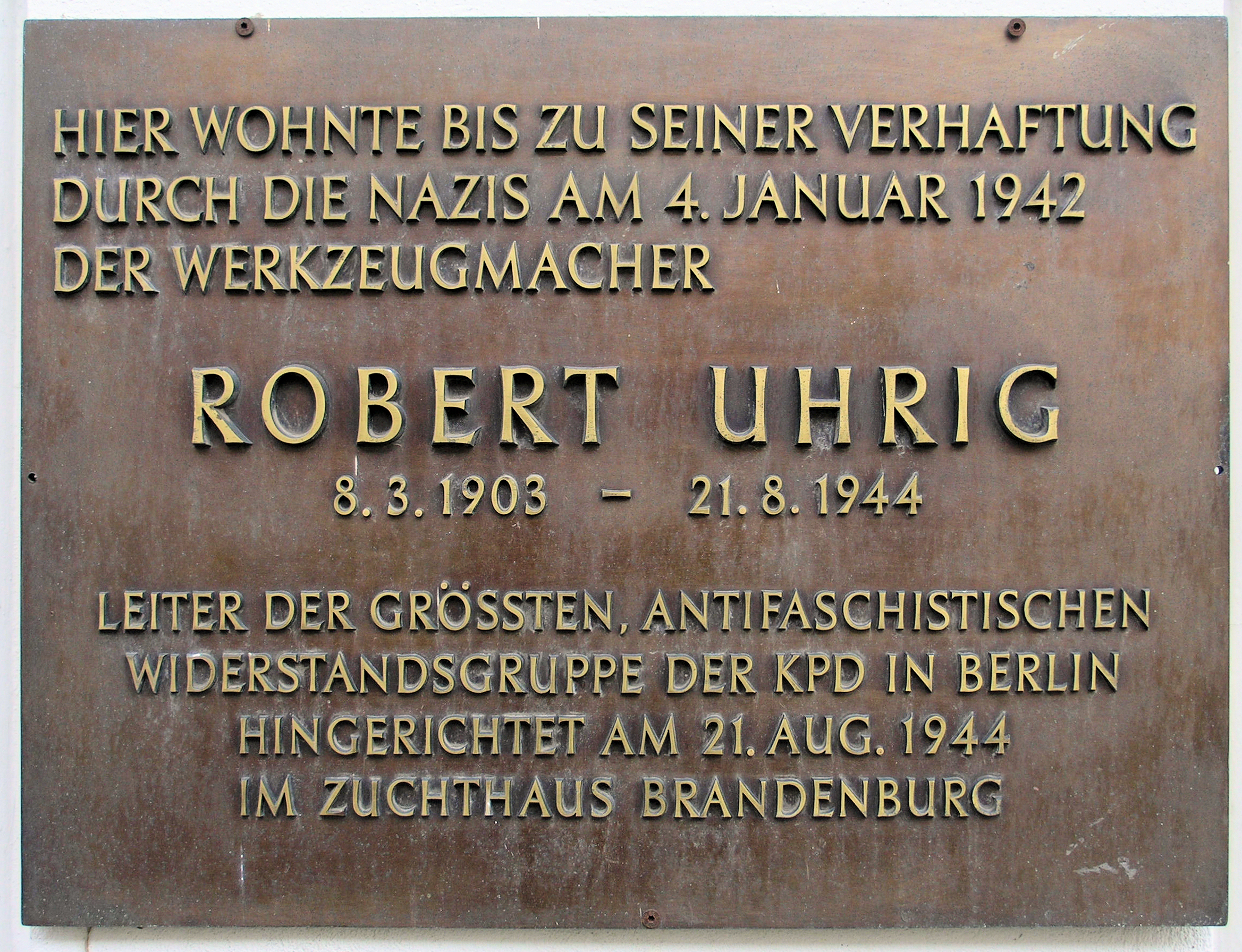
Commemorative plaque at Uhrig's last address in Berlin

In 1941, the Gestapo infiltrated the Uhrig Group with informers and in February 1942, Uhrig and 200 other members of the Uhrig Group were arrested. Uhrig was sent to Sachsenhausen concentration camp. He was sentenced to death by the Volksgerichtshof on June 7, 1944. The sentence was carried out by guillotine August 21, 1944 at the Brandenburg-Görden Prison.

== Family ==
Uhrig was married to Charlotte Kirst Uhrig (February 26, 1907 – October 17, 1992). She was also active in the anti-Nazi resistance and was arrested on September 3, 1943. She was "released" by the Voksgerichthof on April 17, 1944, but was nonetheless sent to Ravensbrück concentration camp, which she survived. After liberation, she and Ellen Kuntz founded the Women's Committee at the Schöneberg district office in Berlin, which mobilized women for the recovery effort in the aftermath of the war. She lived in East Germany.

== Memorials ==
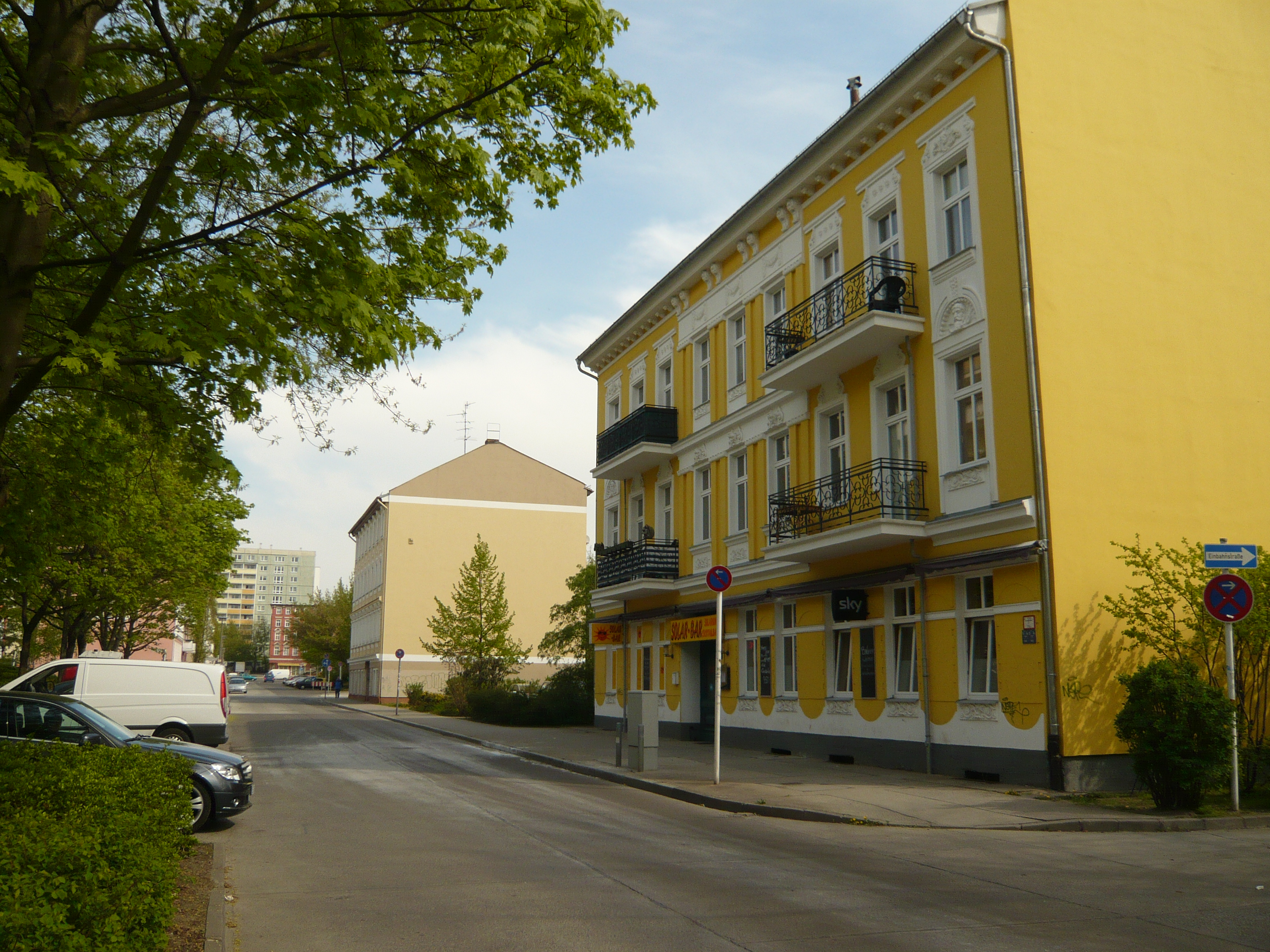
Robert-Uhrig-Straße

- The town cemetery in Berlin-Niederschönhausen, Pankow IV, has a symbolic grave site for Uhrig.
- Robert-Uhrig-Straße, a street in Berlin-Lichtenberg, is named after Uhrig,
- Until the reunification of Germany, the 19th Polytechnische Oberschule, a university in Berlin-Lichtenberg, was named after Uhrig.
- There is a memorial plaque at Wartburgstraße 4, in Berlin-Schöneberg, where Uhrig once lived.
