= Prisons in Germany =

Penal institutions of Germany

JVA Rheinbach, in Rheinbach, North Rhine-Westphalia

Prisons in Germany are a set of penal institutions in the Federal Republic of Germany. Their purpose is rehabilitation – to enable prisoners to lead a life of "social responsibility without committing criminal offenses" upon release – and public safety. Prisons are administered by each federal state, but governed by an overarching federal law. There are 183 prisons in all, with the most located in Germany's most populous states Bavaria and North Rhine-Westphalia. In 2023, the total number of prisoners in Germany including pre-trial detainees was 57,955, an incarceration rate of 68 per 100,000 people.

Prisoners in Germany are given different freedoms and responsibilities. Most prisoners are obligated to perform paid work in an effort to promote resocialization efforts. Often, prisoners have television, posters hanging in their cells, private bathrooms, and free time in which they can roam around outside their cells. These conditions, along with the focus on rehabilitation, have resulted in advocates using German prisons as an example for improvement to prison conditions in other parts of the world.

== History ==
The roots of German prison legislation lie in the "Basic Law" (Grundgesetz), which originated as the constitutional framework for West Germany immediately following the Second World War. The Basic Law enumerates a set of basic principles, including the inviolability of human dignity and a commitment to the rule of law. In Germany, the Federal Constitutional Court is responsible for the enforcement of the Basic Law, and the rights detailed within it cannot be abolished and can only be restricted or amended by primary legislation.

Before 1970, there were five kinds of confinement in Germany. They were Zuchthaus (hard labor prison), Gefängnis (prison), Einschließung (jail), Arbeitshaus (workhouse), and Haft (custody). A Zuchthaus was a prison of physically exerting hard labor, such as breaking rocks, where prisoners had to work, even to the point of collapse. This was repealed by the Große Strafrechtsreform ("Great Panel Law Reform") of the West German penal code, which came into force on April 1, 1970. Today, a Gefängnis is known as a Justizvollzugsanstalt, or "Justice Enforcement Facility".

Until the 1970s, prisoners in Germany were considered to have a "special authority relationship" (besonderes Gewaltverhältnis) with the German state, and their rights could therefore be restricted without the need for primary legislation. However, in 1972, the Federal Constitutional Court rejected this idea, and ruled that prisons must be legislatively regulated. The court ruled further in 1973 that it is constitutionally required that prison sentences have a primary goal of resocializing offenders.

In response, the first German Prison Act was passed in 1976 by federal legislators in accordance with these requirements. In response to a third Federal Constitutional Court ruling in May 2006, a legal basis for juvenile detention was also required to be established by the end of 2007.

In an unrelated development, the Federal German parliament decided in 2006 to reorganize relations between the Federal government and the Länder (states) ("federalism reform"). As part of this reform, the responsibility for prison legislation was assigned to the individual Länder. All 16 Länder have their own prison legislation, many of which are based on a Model Prison Act adopted August 23, 2011 by the Länder ministers of justice. The 1976 federal legislation remains in force for regulatory areas not covered by Länder laws.

== Organization ==
As of 2021, there are several forms of detention in the German penal system.

- Pre-trial detention (Untersuchungshaft)
- Criminal detention of juveniles (Jugendstrafe)
- Criminal detention of adults (Freiheitsstrafe)
- Detention of criminals who pose a risk to public safety after their sentences, called "preventive detention" (Sicherungsverwahrung)
- Imprisonment as a sanction for non-payment of fines (Ersatzfreiheitsstrafe)
- Detention pending extradition of the detainee (Auslieferungshaft)

The above forms of imprisonment or detention fall under the category of Justizvollzug. Forensic confinement in psychiatric facilities (Maßregelvollzug) is considered a separate class of detention, but is still within the purview of the criminal justice system. In addition, a few types of imprisonment fall outside the criminal justice system, including:

- Youth arrests (Jugendarrest)
- Military penal detention (Strafarrest)
- Detention of migrants pending deportation (Abschiebehaft)
- Civil confinement (Zivilhaft)

People detained under these forms of detention are housed sometimes in purpose-built facilities, but often in the general prison system.

The head offices for the state prison services are in the respective state justice ministry. There, a prison service department controls the organization of the prison service, personnel matters, basic and advanced training for prison staff, budgets, construction, cooperation in prison service legislation, the employment of prisoners, and vocational training and education for prisoners. It also reviews petitions and complaints and its representatives visit and inspect the prisons regularly. There is no mid-level authority anymore between the Ministry of Justice and the prisons. This direct contact facilitates decision-making and ensures the ministry is close to the life of the prison service.

As a rule, those subject to pretrial confinement are housed at a facility close to the public prosecutor's office that is prosecuting the case. Criminals who have never been imprisoned or have been imprisoned for not more than three months are usually assigned to prisons for first-time offenders (Erstvollzug). Recidivists are assigned to so-called regular imprisonment (Regelvollzug). People who receive long sentences are imprisoned at a maximum security prison (Langstrafenanstalt). Special institutions are also provided for female and juvenile prisoners and for those with special health or psychiatric needs. Social-therapeutic prisons (sozialtherapeutische Haftanstalten) are special departments for sexual offenders; in these prisons, groups of 10-15 prisoners live together, supported by assigned social workers, correction officers and psychologists. The goal of these sections is to resocialize prisoners.

=== Cost ===
In February 2025, Wirtschaftswoche published the state's cost per inmate. The average cost per day was estimated to be €200; for example €150 in North Rhine-Westphalia if all prisons are filled to capacity, and €200 at the 2025 75% occupancy rate. 60% of the cost was spent on staff.

== Prison population ==
The total number of prisoners in Germany as of 31 March 2024 was 43,746, of which 40,405 were imprisoned, 2,737 were in youth custody, and 604 were in preventive detention. The following table gives the prison population over time.

Year	Male	Female	Total
2017	48,609	3,034	51,643
2018	48,026	2,931	50,957
2019	47,593	2,996	50,589
2020	43,427	2,642	46,069
2021	42,068	2,520	44,588
2022	40,086	2,406	42,492
2023	41,642	2,590	44,232
2024	41,260	2,486	43,746

A large proportion of German prisoners are foreigners; over 16,000 in 2024, or about 37% of the prison population. In 2019, all states of Germany reported an increase in the share of foreign and stateless inmates in the preceding 3-5 year period, with the proportion above half in several states. The largest foreign groups were from Poland, Tunisia, Libya, Czech Republic and Georgia. Non-German-speaking foreign prisoners often do not understand prison rules because they are not explained in their native tongue.

Pre-trial detainees make up about 21% of Germany's total prison population. About 1% of prisoners are minors or juveniles. The total occupancy level of German prisons is around 80% of official capacity.

== See also ==
- Crime in Germany
- Law enforcement in Germany
