= List of Germans who resisted Nazism =

This list contains the names of individuals involved in the German resistance to Nazism, but is not a complete list. Names are periodically added, but not all names are known. There are both men and women on this list of Widerstandskämpfer ("Resistance fighters") primarily German, some Austrian or from elsewhere, who risked or lost their lives in a number of ways. They tried to overthrow the National Socialist regime, they denounced its wars as criminal, tried to prevent World War II and sabotaged German attacks on other countries. Some tried to protect those who were being harmed and persecuted by the Nazis, others merely refused to contribute to the Nazi war effort. Most of those on the list worked with others; their affiliated resistance group or groups are listed. Where no group is mentioned, the individual acted alone.

== A ==
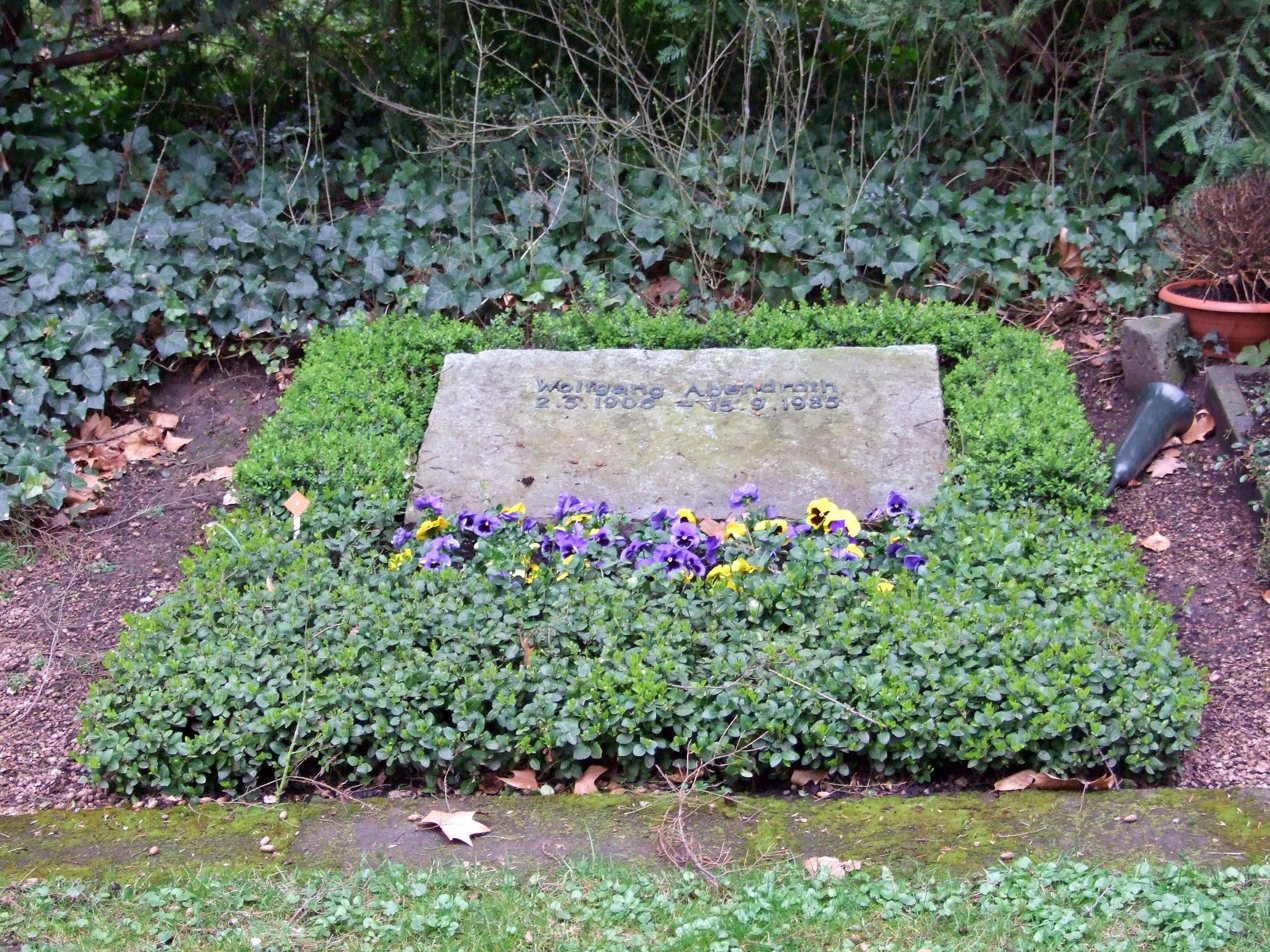
Wolfgang Abendroth's grave

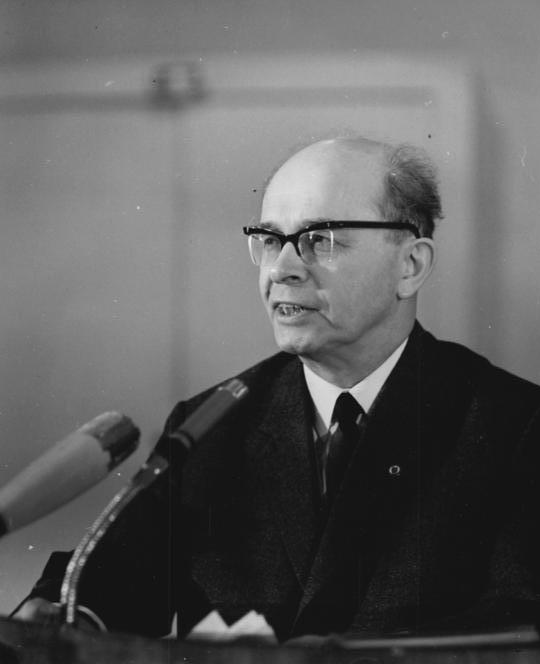
Alexander Abusch (1966)

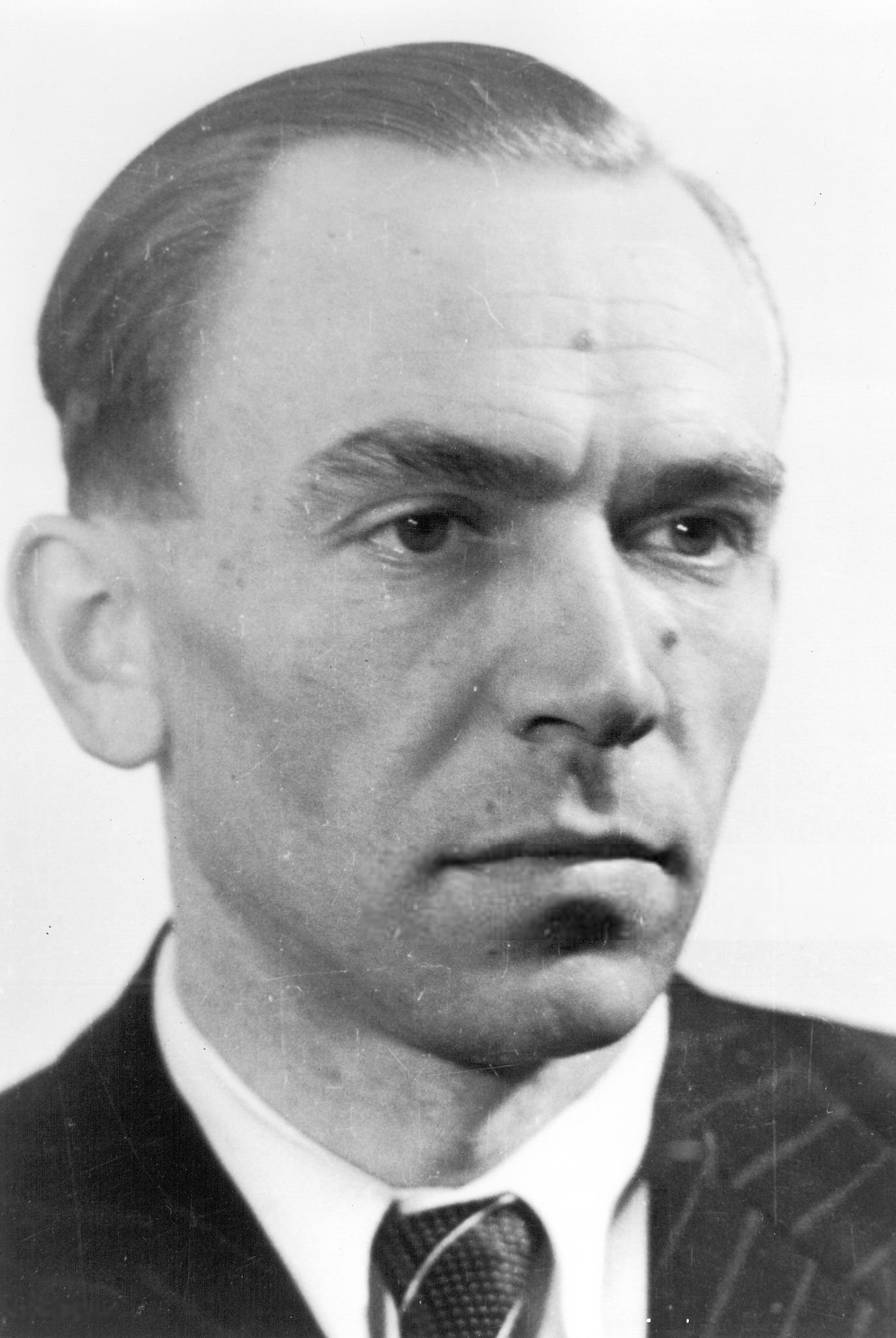
Anton Ackermann c. 1950

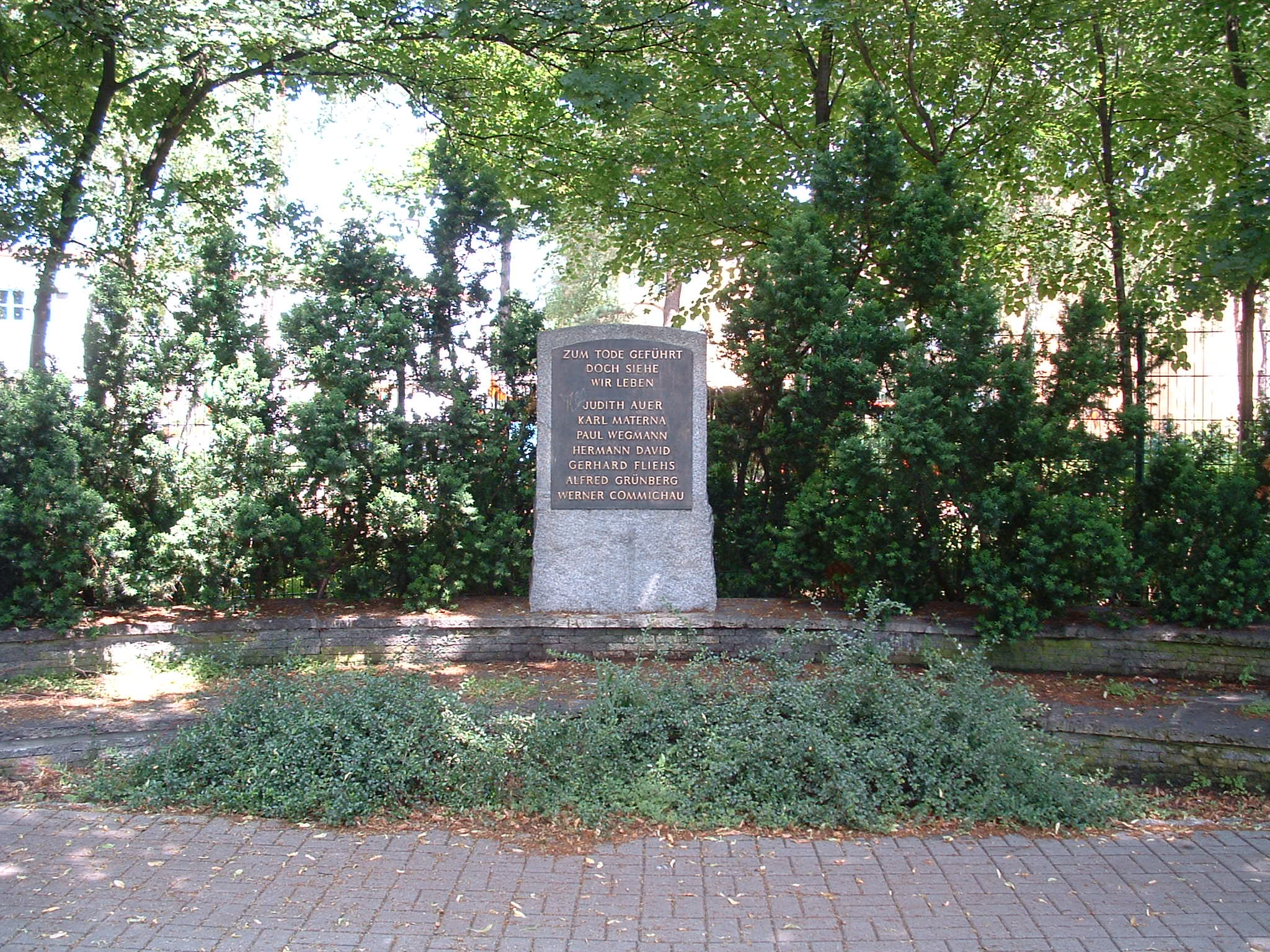
Memorial in Berlin-Bohnsdorf for seven Bohnsdorfers killed resisting the Nazi government. The caption reads: Brought to death, yet see: we live.

- Anton Ackermann (real name: Eugen Hanisch, 25 December 1905 Thalheim, Saxony – 4 May 1973 East Berlin) was an East German politician
- Wilhelm Abegg (1876–1951) Deutsche Demokratische Partei (DDP), National Committee for a Free Germany in Switzerland
- Wolfgang Abendroth (1906–1985) KPO, Neu Beginnen, ELAS
- Friedrich Ablass (1894–1949) DDP
- Robert Abshagen (1911–1944), KPD
- Alexander Abusch (1902–1982), KPD
- Alfred Althus (1888–1943), SPD, supporter of Polish resistance group organized by Ignaz Hulka
- Günter Ammon (1918–1995), White Rose
- Edgar André (1894–1936), KPD
- Willy Anker (1885–1960), SPD
- Agnes Asche (1881–1966), SPD member, arrested for distributing illegal newspapers
- Rosa Aschenbrenner (1885–1967), Rote Hilfe
- Judith Auer (1905–1944), Saefkow-Jacob-Bästlein Organization
- Walter Auerbach (1905–1975) SPD, International Transport Workers' Federation
- Hermann Axen (1916–1992), KPD

== B ==
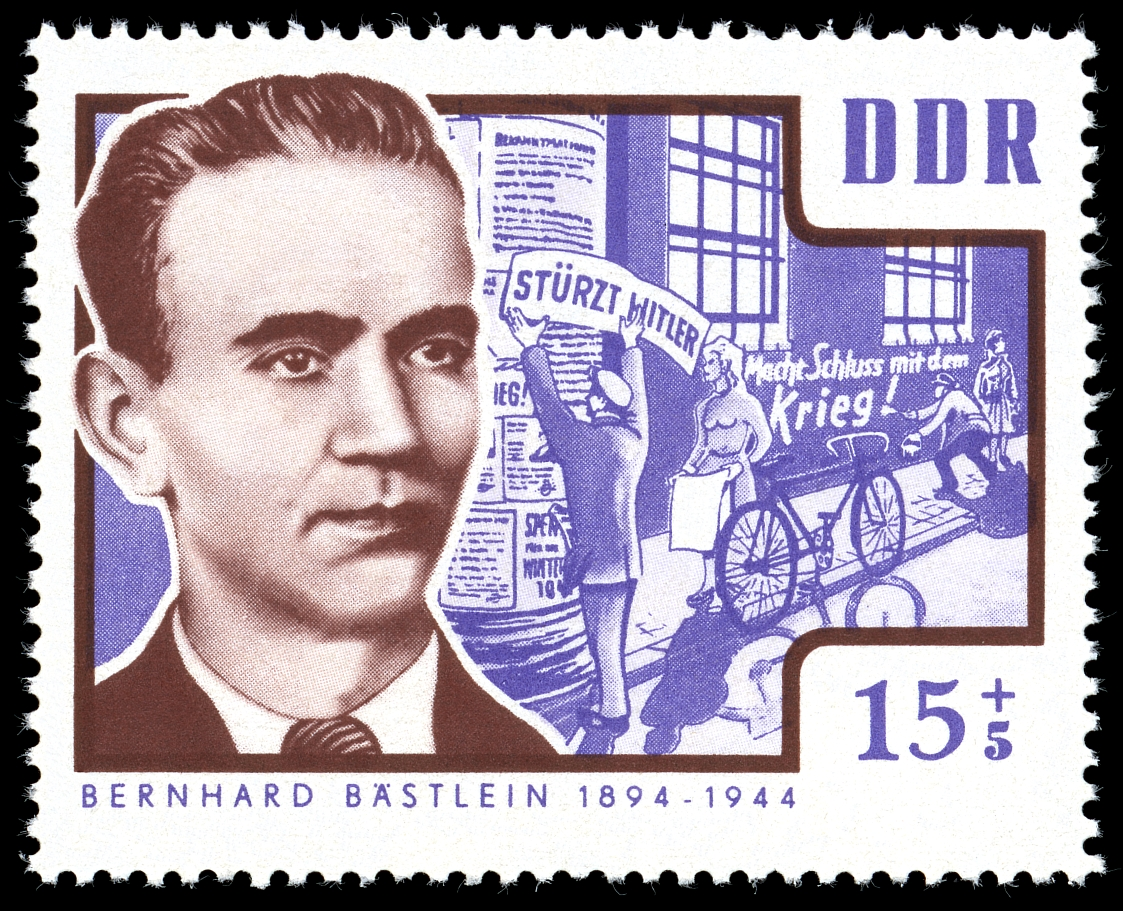
Bernhard Bästlein, 1964 stamp from the GDR

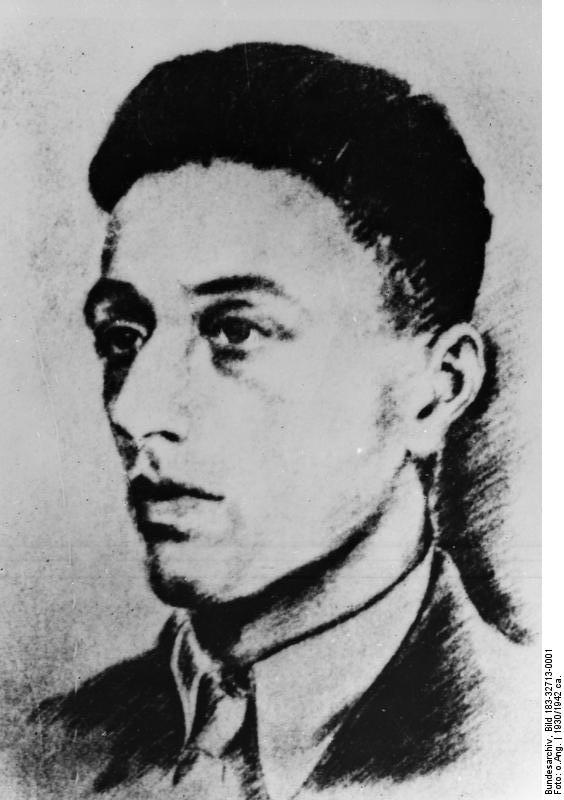
Herbert Baum, 1930 portrait from a photograph

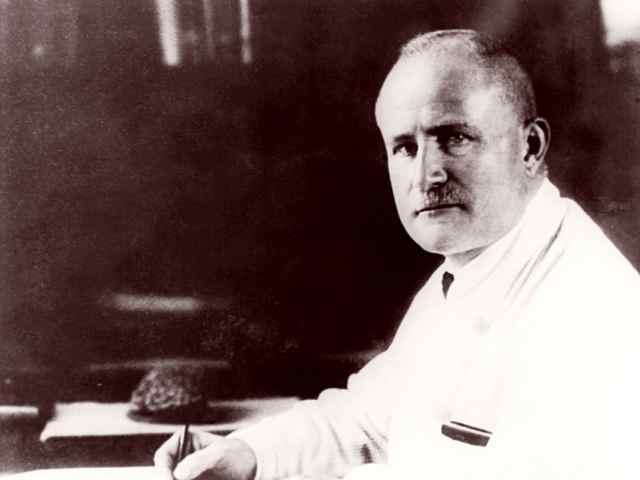
Hans Berger

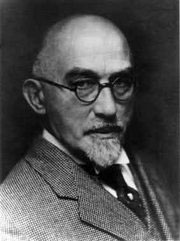
Hermann Böse

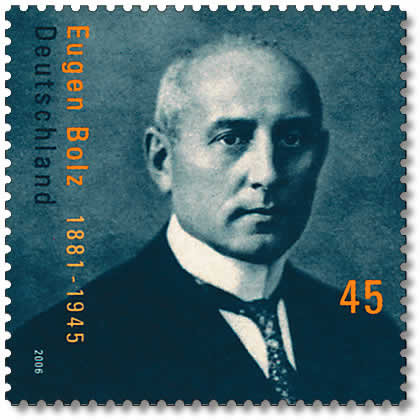
German stamp on the occasion of Eugen Bolz' 125th birthday

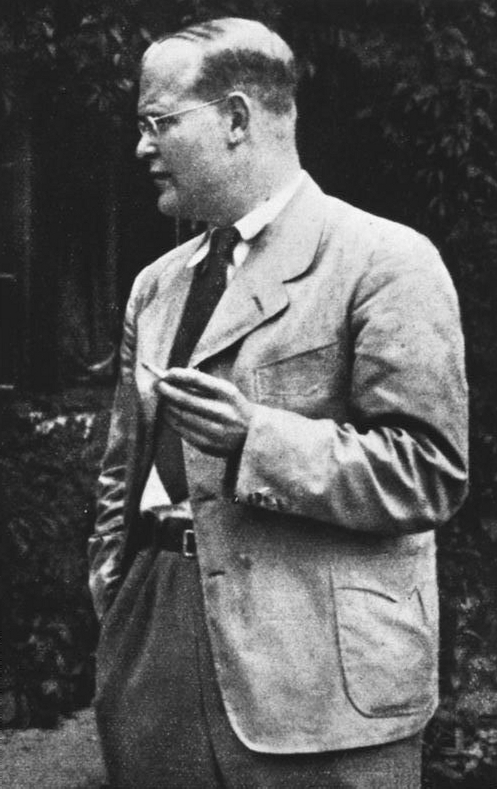
Dietrich Bonhoeffer

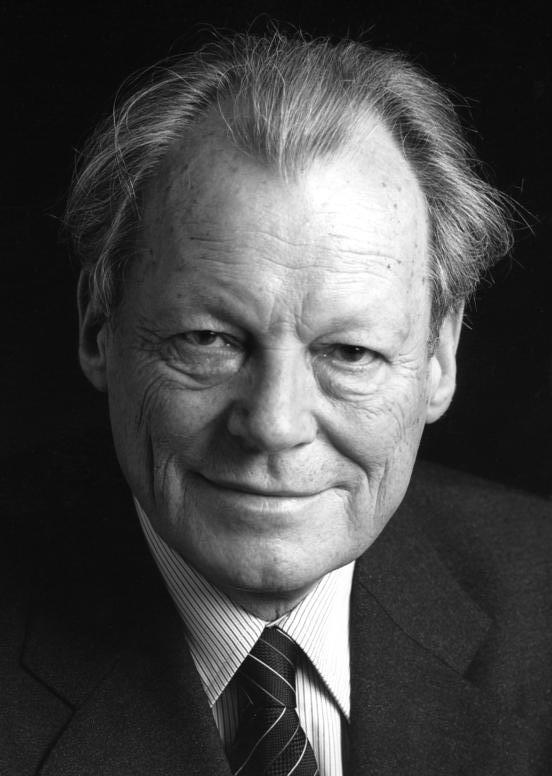
Willy Brandt

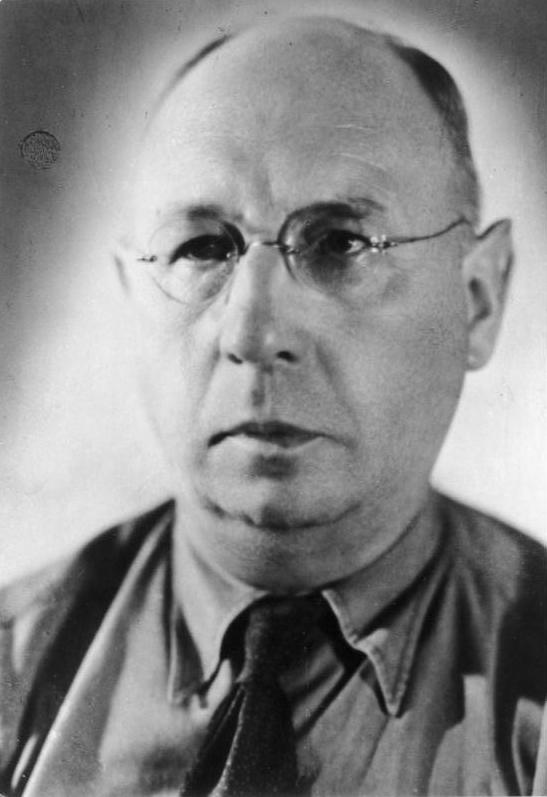
Hermann Brill

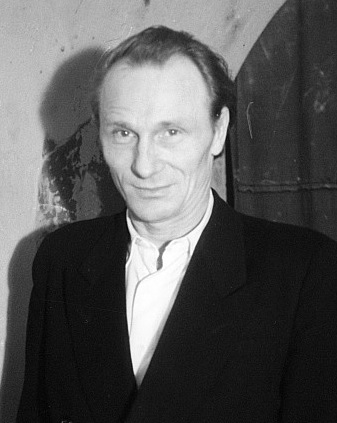
Ernst Busch

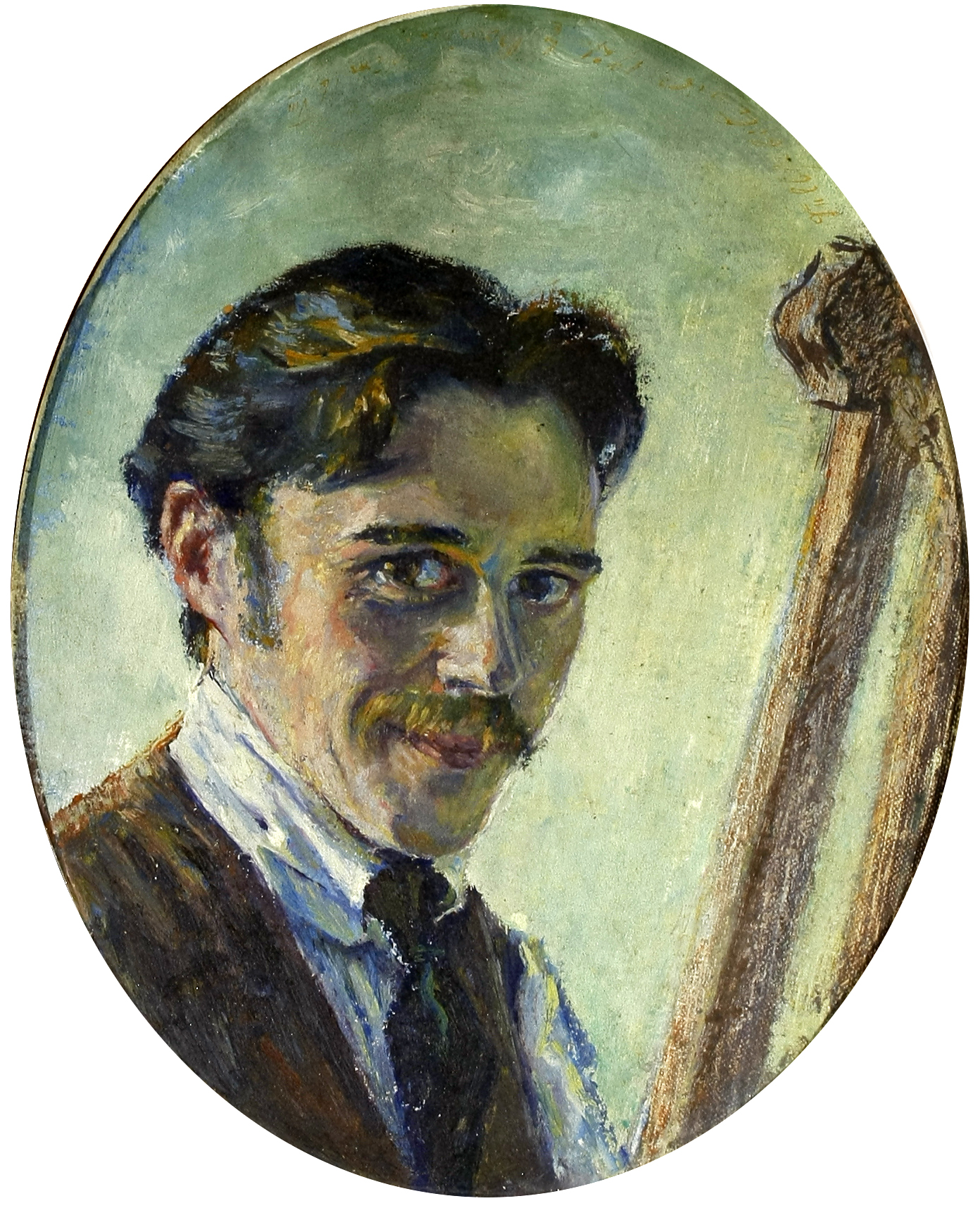
Erwin Bowien (1899–1972). Catalogue raisonné N° 2171: Youthful self-portrait, 1920s.

- Bruno Bachler (1924–2015), Edelweißpiraten
- Lagi von Ballestrem (1909–1955), Solf Circle
- Herbert Balzer (1897–1945), KPD
- Karl Baier (1887–1973), Rote Hilfe
- Erich Baron (1881–1931), KPD
- Karl Barth (1886–1968), theologian, Confessing Church
- Heinz Bartsch (1906–1944), KPD
- Bernhard Bästlein (1894–1944), Bästlein-Jacob-Abshagen Group and Saefkow-Jacob-Bästlein Organization
- Albert Battel (1891–1952), Wehrmacht
- Herbert Baum (1912–1942), KJVD, Herbert Baum Group
- Marianne Baum (1912–1942), Herbert Baum Group
- Erwin Beck (1911–1988), SPD-RK
- Artur Becker (1905–1938), KPD
- Arno Behrisch (1913–1989), Socialist Workers' Party of Germany, ITF
- Alfons Beil (1896–1997), Catholic church
- Hans Beimler (1895–1936), KPD
- Walter Beling (1899–1988), Résistance
- Georg Benjamin (1895–1942), KPD
- Helene Berg (1906–2006)
- Hans Berger (1916–1944), laboratory assistant
- Hilde Berger (1914–2011), IKD, secretary of Oskar Schindler
- Josef Bergmann (1913–2005) KPO
- Georg Berthelé (1877–1949), Rote Hilfe
- Gustav Bermel (1927–1944), Ehrenfeld Group
- Eberhard Bethge (1909–2000), student of Dietrich Bonhoeffer
- Wilhelm Beuttel (1901–1944), Rote Hilfe
- Karl Biedermann (1890–1945), Wehrmacht, Operation Radetzky
- Dagobert Biermann (1904–1943), KPD
- Charlotte Bischoff (1901–1994), KPD, Red Orchestra
- Peter Blachstein (1911–1977), Socialist Workers' Party of Germany, SJVD, Neuer Weg Group
- Conrad Blenkle (1901–1943), KPD
- Willi Bleicher (1907–1981), KPD, unionist
- Werner Blumenberg (1900–1965), Socialist Front
- Franz Bobzien (1906–1941), Socialist Workers' Party of Germany, SJVD
- Herbert Bochow (1906–1942), KPD
- Franz Boehm (1880–1945), Roman Catholic parish priest
- Gustav Böhrnsen (1914–1998) SPD, unionist
- Hermann Böse (1870–1943), Communist resistance
- Walter Bohne (1903–1944), Bästlein-Jacob-Abshagen Group
- Wilhelm Boller (1904–1943), Rote Hilfe
- Eugen Bolz (1881–1945), Zentrumspartei
- Dietrich Bonhoeffer (1906–1945), Confessing Church
- Klaus Bonhoeffer (1901–1945), Confessing Church
- Erwin Bowien (1899–1972), Painter and author
- Jakob Boulanger (1897–1968), KPD
- Willy Brandt (1913–1992), Socialist Workers' Party of Germany
- Otto Brass (1875–1950), Deutsche Volksfront
- Willi Bredel (1901–1964), KPD
- Rudolf Breitscheid (1874–1944), SPD
- Otto Brenner (1907–1972), Socialist Workers' Party of Germany
- Hein Brettschneider (d. 1944), KPD
- Hermann Brill (1895–1959), Neu Beginnen, Deutsche Volksfront, Buchenwald Popular Front Committee
- Karl Bröger (1886–1944), SPD
- Paul Bromme (1906–1975), Sopade, RSD
- Arnolt Bronnen (1895–1959), Willy-Fred
- Elisabeth Bruhn (1893–1944), KPD, Bästlein-Jacob-Abshagen Group
- Gustav Bruhn (1889–1944), KPD, Bästlein-Jacob-Abshagen Group
- Eberhard Brünen (1906–1980), Socialist Workers' Party of Germany
- Karl Brunner (resistance fighter) (1889–1964), Heimwehr
- Werner Bruschke (1898–1995), SPD
- Adolf Buchholz "Appel" (1912–1978), KPD
- Franz Xaver Büchs (1889–1940), KPO
- Klaus Bücking (1908–1980), Rote Hilfe
- Willi Budich (1890–1938), Rote Hilfe
- Carl Burmester (1901–1934) KPD
- Carl Burmester (1905–1945) SPD
- Ernst Busch (1900–1980), actor, KPD
- Wilhelm Busch (1897–1966), Confessing Church

== C ==
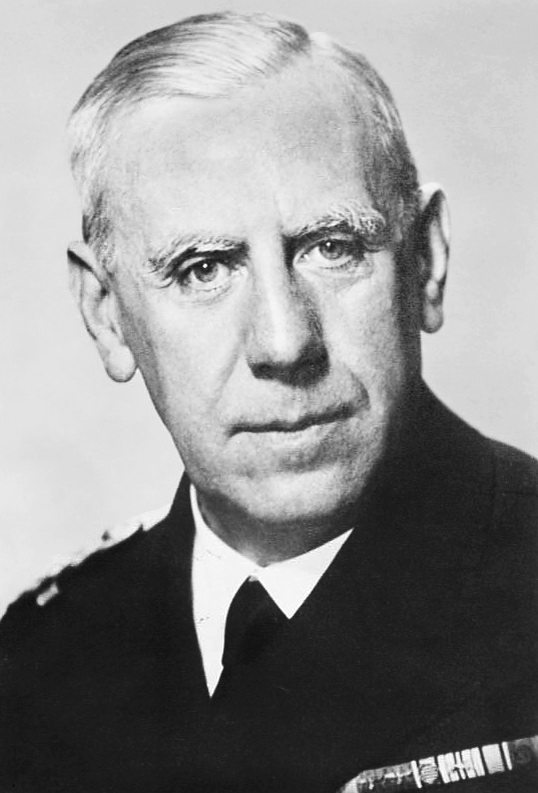
Wilhelm Franz Canaris

- Walter Caldonazzi (1916–1945), Maier-Messner-Caldonazzi Group
- Wilhelm Canaris (1887–1945), Abwehr
- Emil Carlebach (1914–2001), KPD
- Walter Caro (1909–1988), KPD
- Walter Caro (chemist) (1909–1988), chemist
- Rudolf Claus (1893–1935), Rote Hilfe
- Hermann Cornelius (1898–1945), Bästlein-Jacob-Abshagen Group
- Hans Christoffers (d. 1942), KPD
- Heinrich Czerkus (1894–1945), KPD
- Franz Czeminski (1876–1945), SPD

== D ==
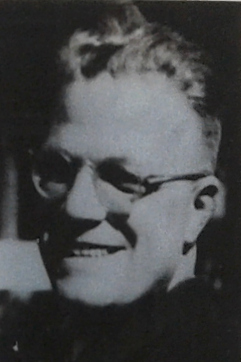
The Jesuit Alfred Delp was an influential member of the Kreisau Circle - one of the few clandestine German Resistance groups operating inside Nazi Germany

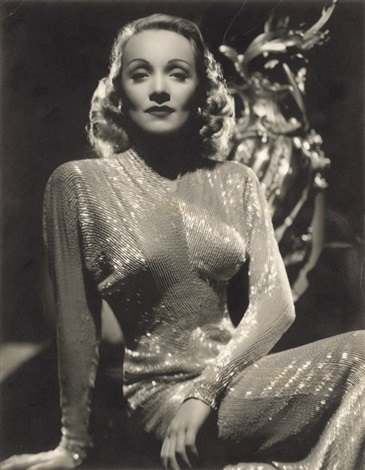
Marlene Dietrich

- Jakob Dautzenberg (1897–1979), KPD
- Alfred Delp (1907–1945), Catholic church
- Ria Deeg (1907–2000), Rote Hilfe
- Anton Dey (1892–1973), SPD
- Marlene Dietrich (1901–1992), actress and singer
- Max Diamant (1908–1992), Socialist Workers' Party of Germany
- Willi Dickhut (1904–1992), KPD
- Kurt Karl Doberer (1904–1993), SPD
- Hans von Dohnanyi (1902–1945), Confessing Church
- Leo Drabent (1899–1944), Bästlein-Jacob-Abshagen Group
- Fritz Dressel (1896–1933), KPD
- Joseph E. Drexel (1896–1976), Ernst Niekisch resistance movement

== E ==
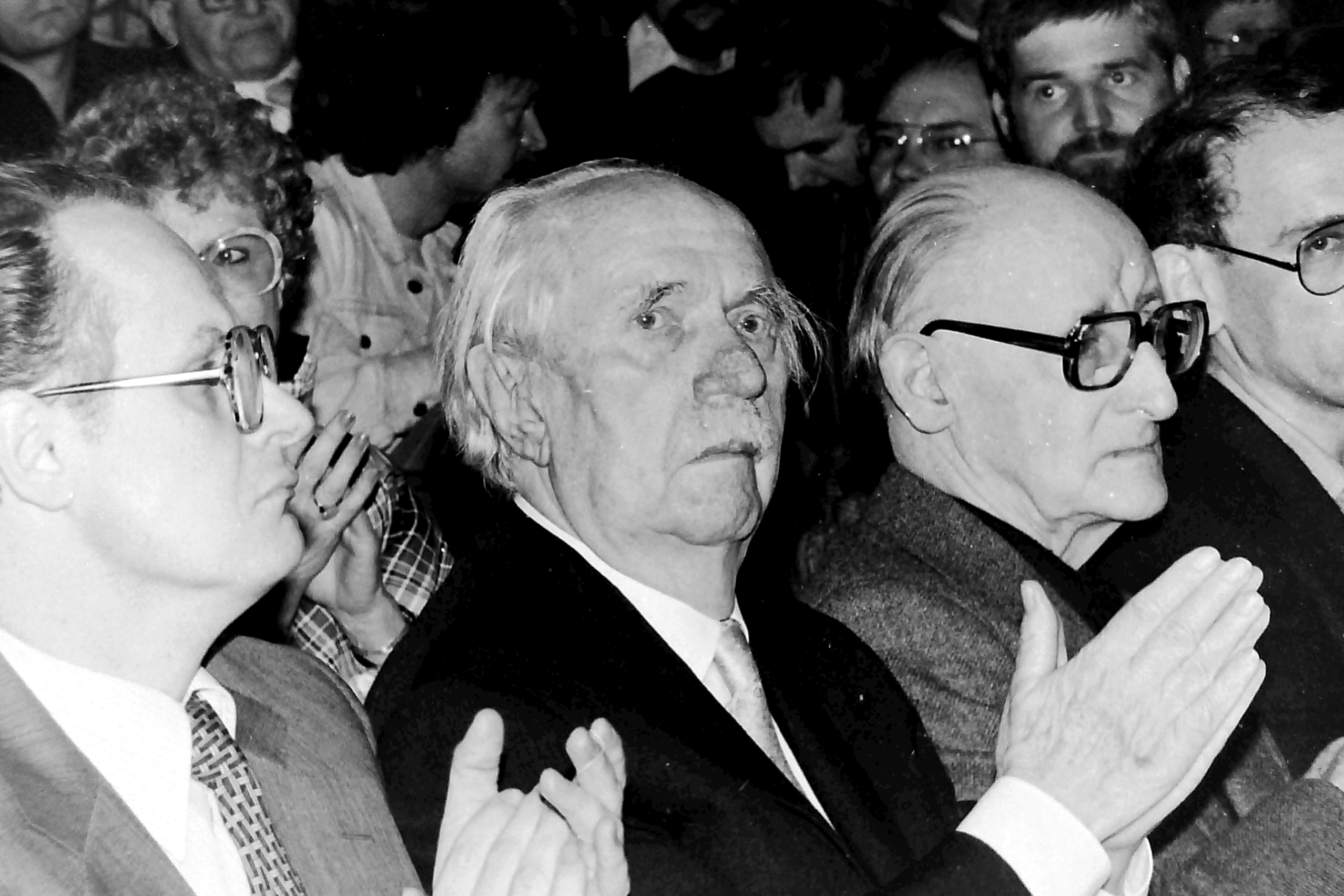
Eberhard at the award ceremony of the Carl von Ossietzky Medal, 1979

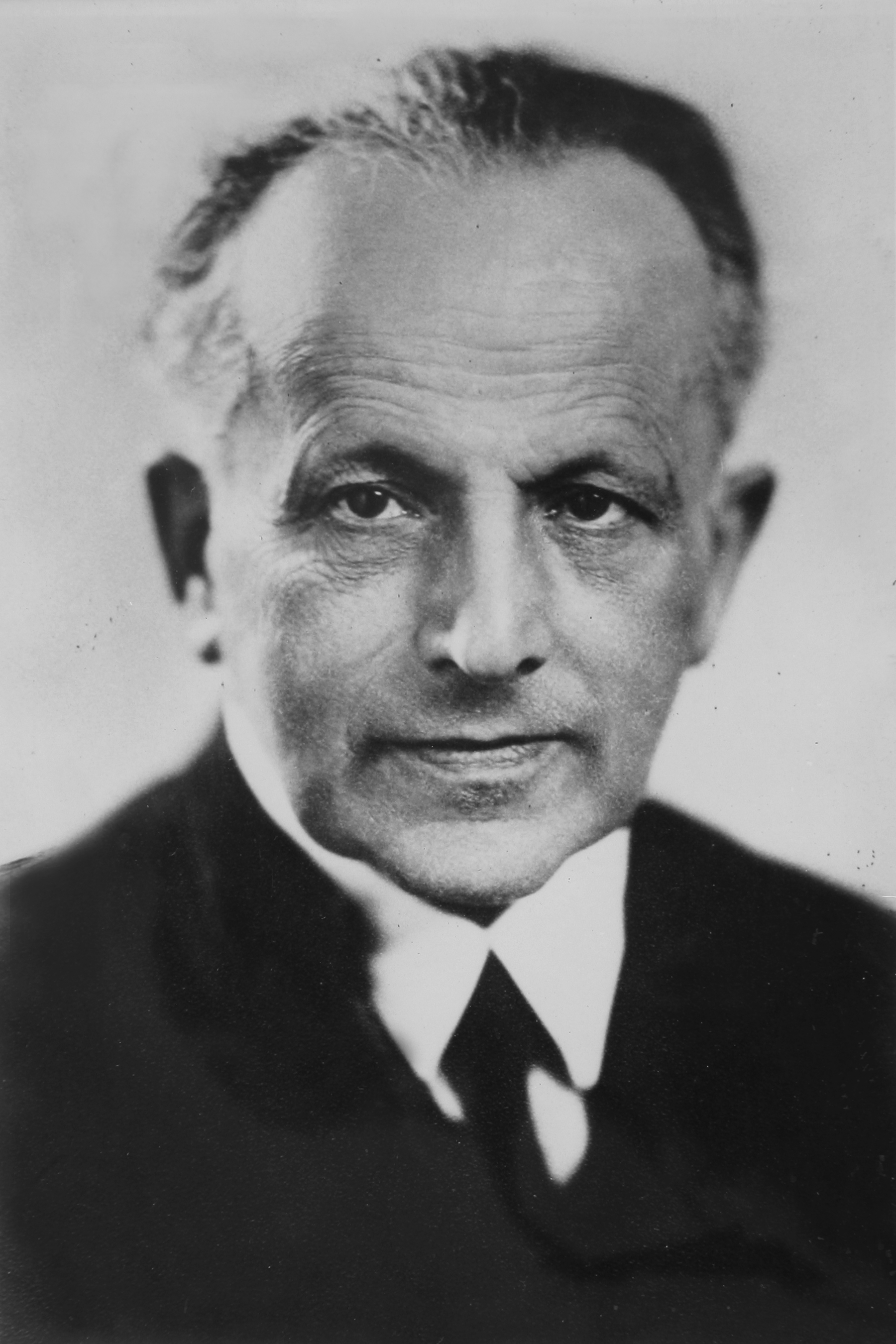
Hans Philipp Ehrenberg, ca. 1940

- Fritz Eberhard (1896–1982), ISK
- Erwin Eckert (1893–1972), BRSD, KPD
- Hugo Eckener (1868–1954), manager of the Luftschiffbau Zeppelin
- Hans Ehrenberg (1883–1958), Lutheran theologian, a founder of the Confessing Church
- Willi Eichler (1896–1971), ISK
- Ernst Hampel (1919–1945), communist
- Elvira Eisenschneider (1924–1944), NKFD
- Paul Eisenschneider (1901–1944), KPD
- Georg Elser (1903–1945), acted alone
- Arthur Emmerlich (1907–1942), KPD
- August Enderle (1887–1959), Socialist Workers' Party of Germany
- Ernst Enge (1893–1944), KPD
- Otto Engert (1895–1945), KPD
- Leopold Engleitner (1905–2013), Jehovah's Witness
- Fritz Erler (1913–1967), Neu Beginnen
- Anna Essinger (1879–1960), Landschulheim Herrlingen
- Erika Etter (d. 1945), KJVD
- Walter Eucken (1891–1950), economist

== F ==
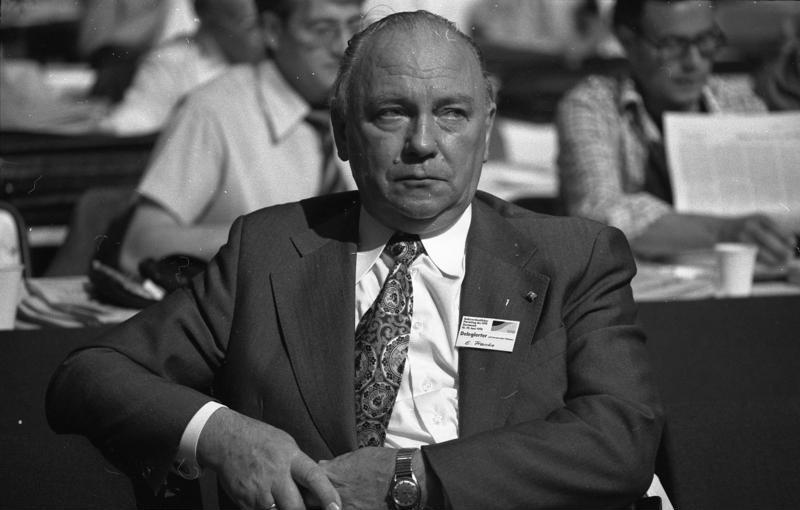
Egon Franke, 1976

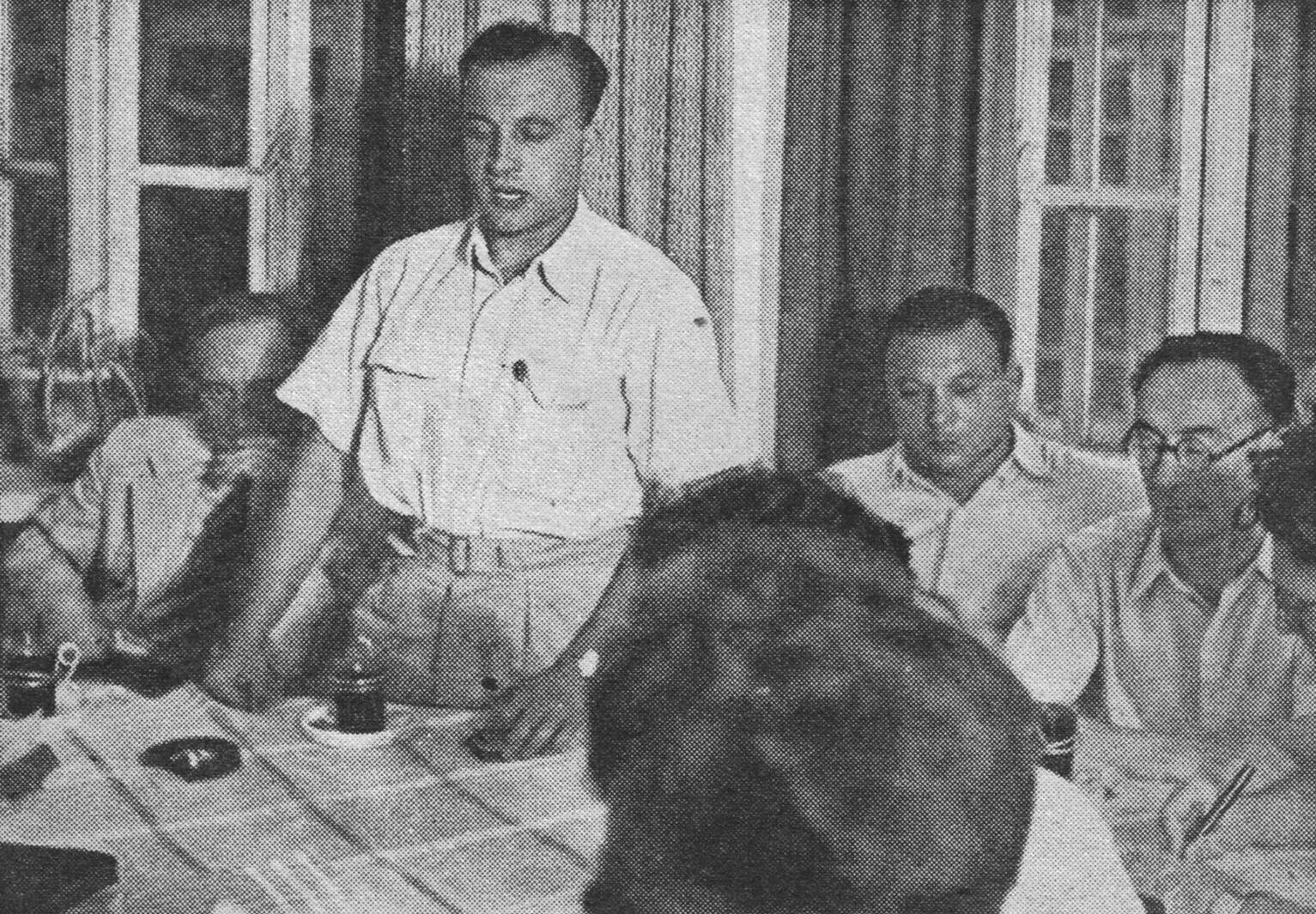
David Frankfurter in British Mandate of Palestine, 1945

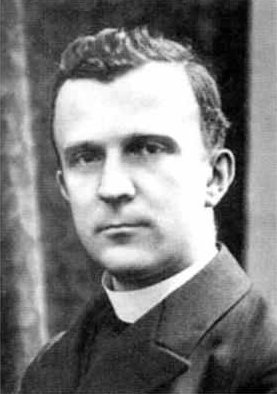
August Froehlich

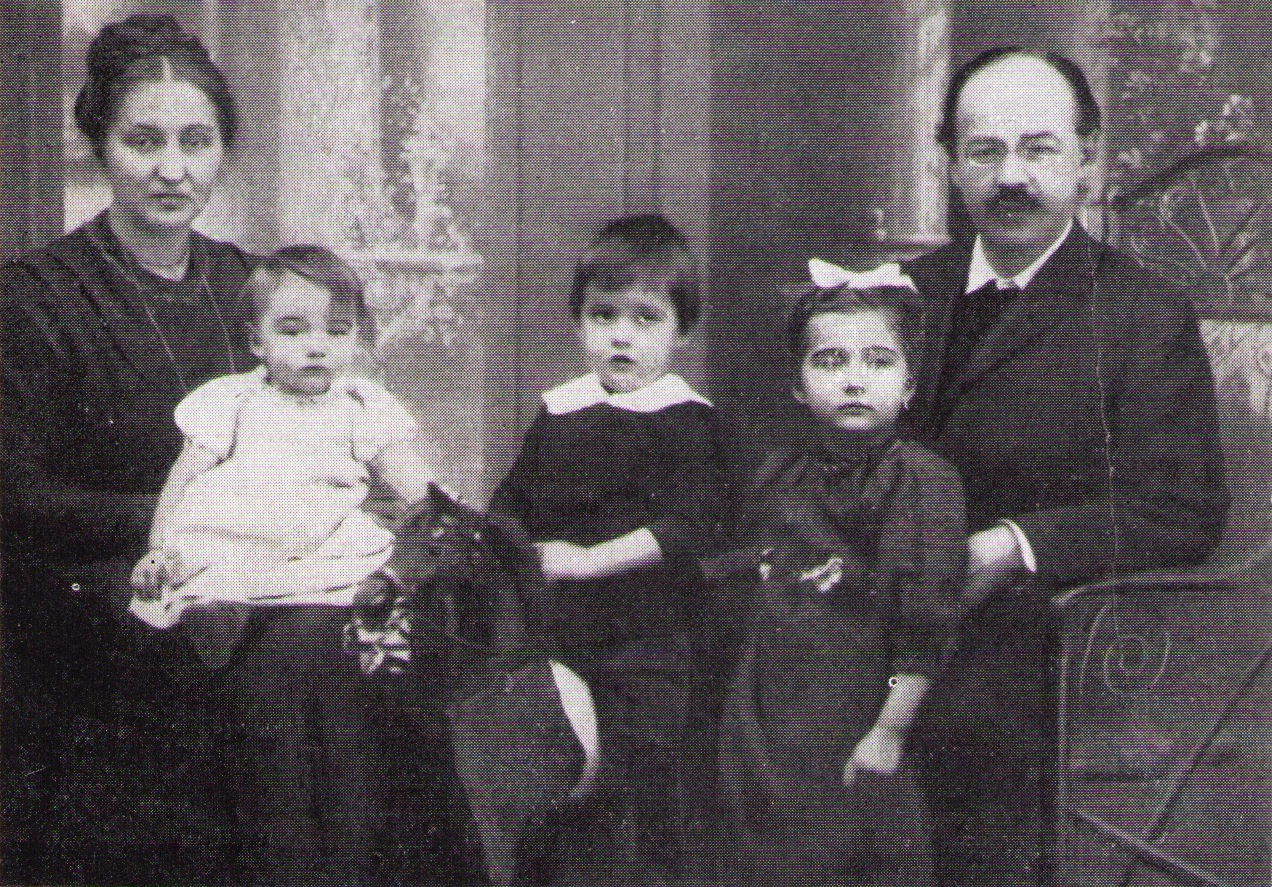
Fuchs in 1912 with his wife and three oldest children; Klaus is on his mother's lap

- Dora Fabian (1901–1935), Socialist Workers' Party of Germany
- Walter Fabian (1902–1995), Socialist Workers' Party of Germany
- Marianne Feldhammer (1909–1996), Willy-Fred
- Werner Fischer (1913–1945), KPD
- Hermann Fischer (1912–1984), Rote Hilfe and Brümmer Kleine resistance group
- Karl Fischer (1893–1940), KPD
- Mildred Fish-Harnack (1902–1943), Red Orchestra
- Herbert Frahm see Willy Brandt
- Alfred Frank (1884–1945), KPD
- Egon Franke (1913–1995), SPD
- David Frankfurter (1909–1982), acted alone
- Hermann Frieb (1909–1943), Neu Beginnen
- Georg Fritze (1874–1939), BRSD
- August Froehlich (1891–1942), Catholic church
- Paul Frölich (1884–1953), Socialist Workers' Party of Germany
- Emil Fuchs (1874–1971), BRSD
- Albert Funk (1894–1933), KPD
- Max Fürst (1905–1978), author
- Franz Josef Furtwängler (1894–1965), SPD

== G ==
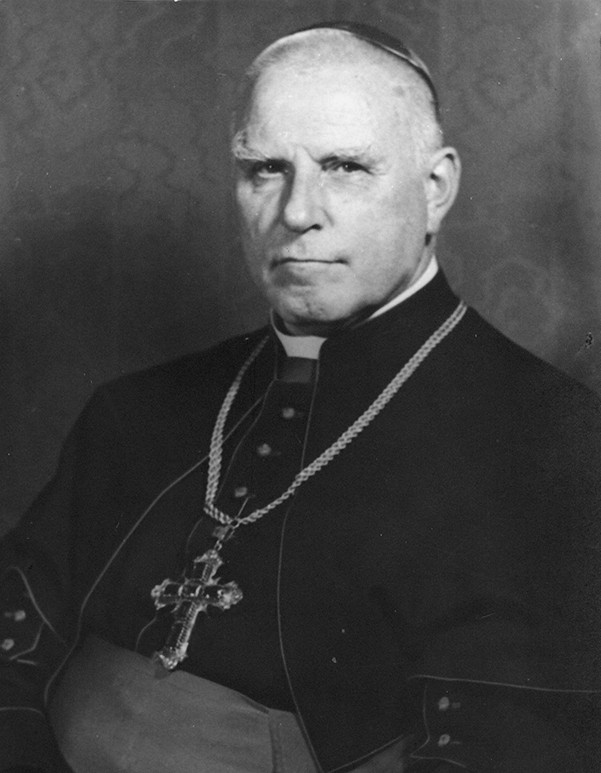
Clemens August Graf von Galen

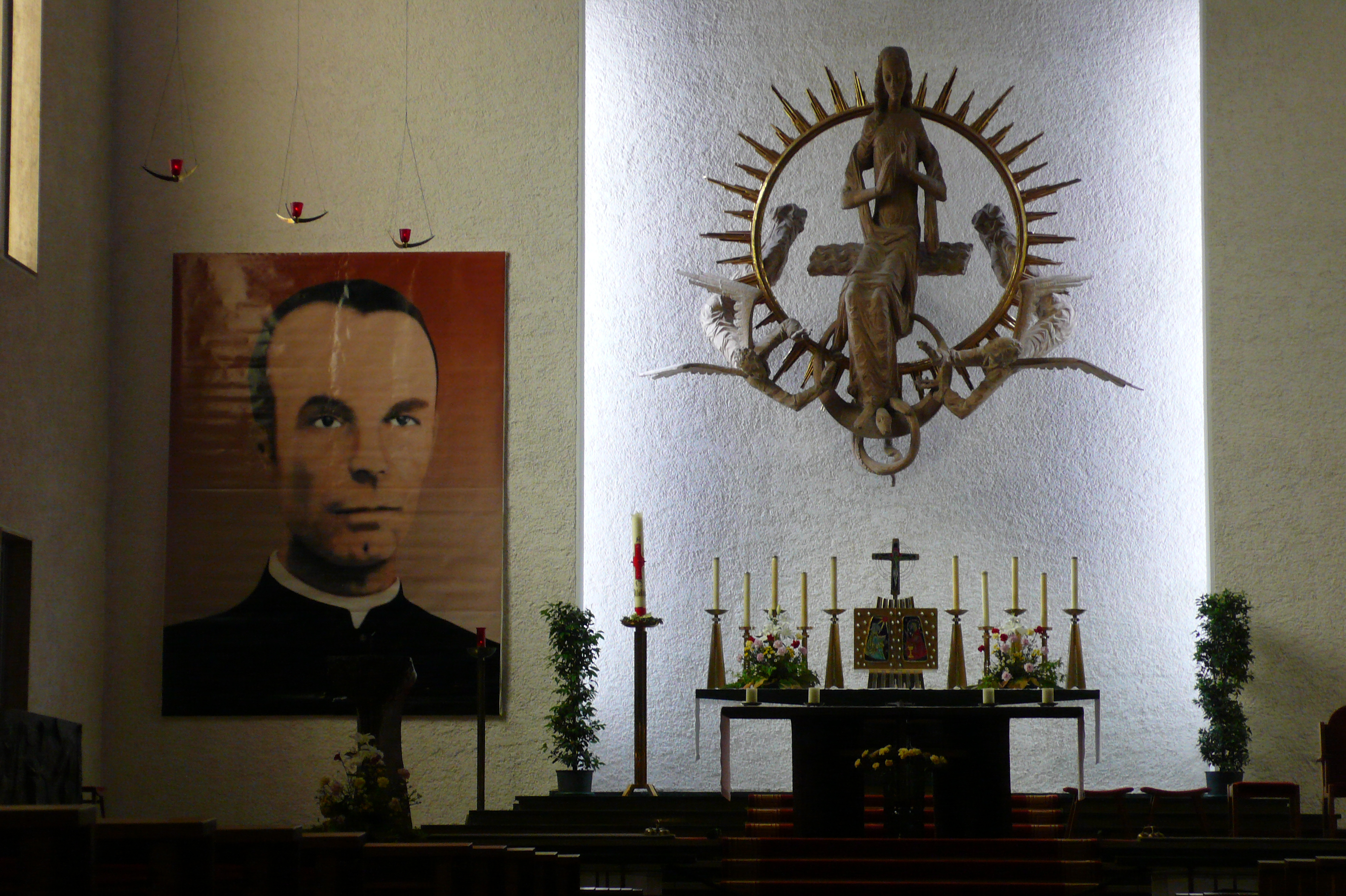
Image of Jakob Gapp in Wattens

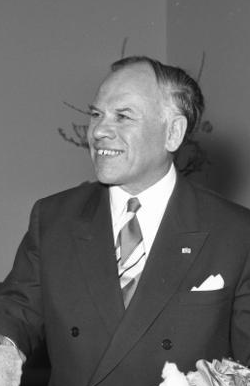
Eugen Gerstenmaier, 1960

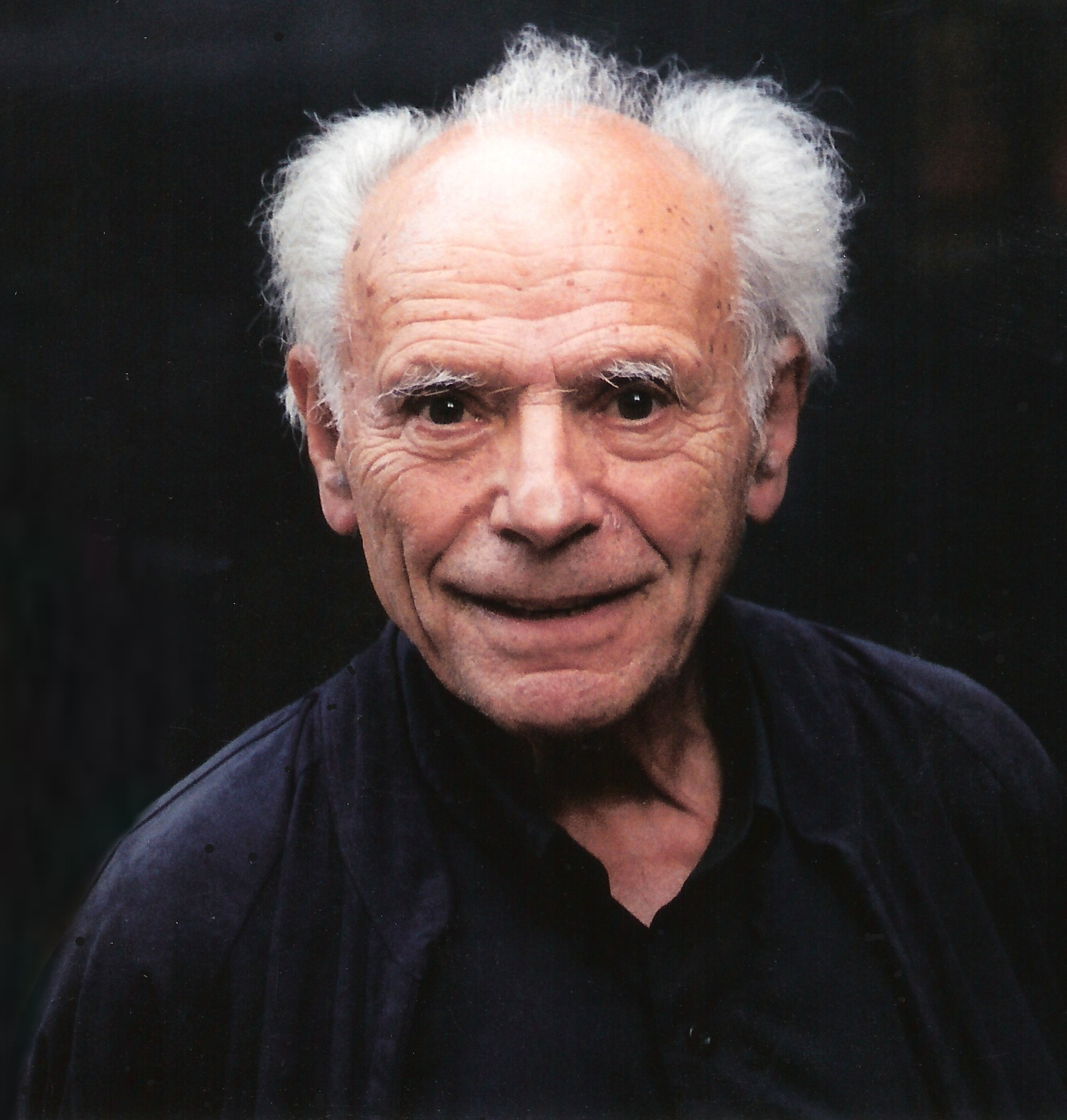
Peter Gingold

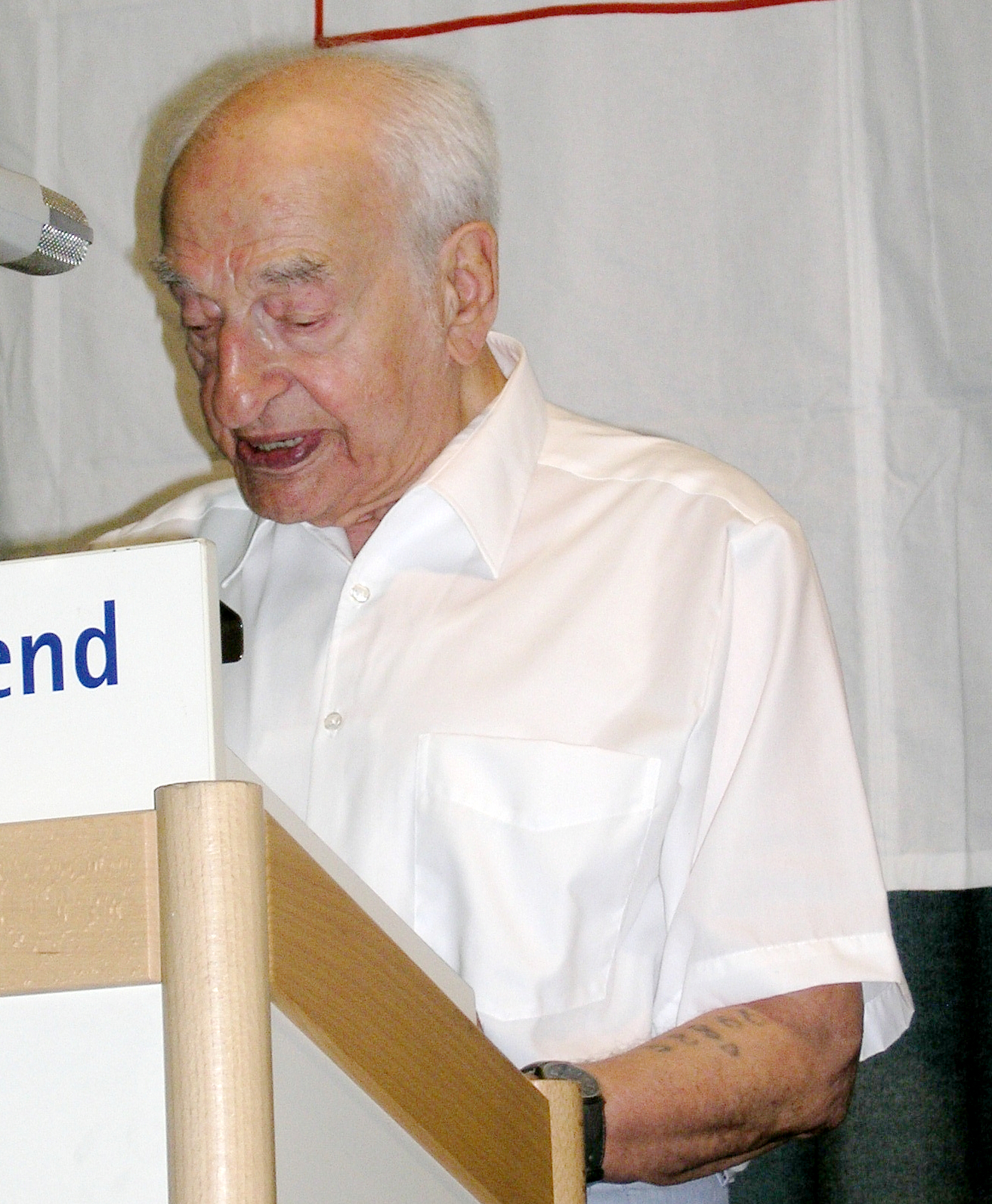
Kurt Julius Goldstein

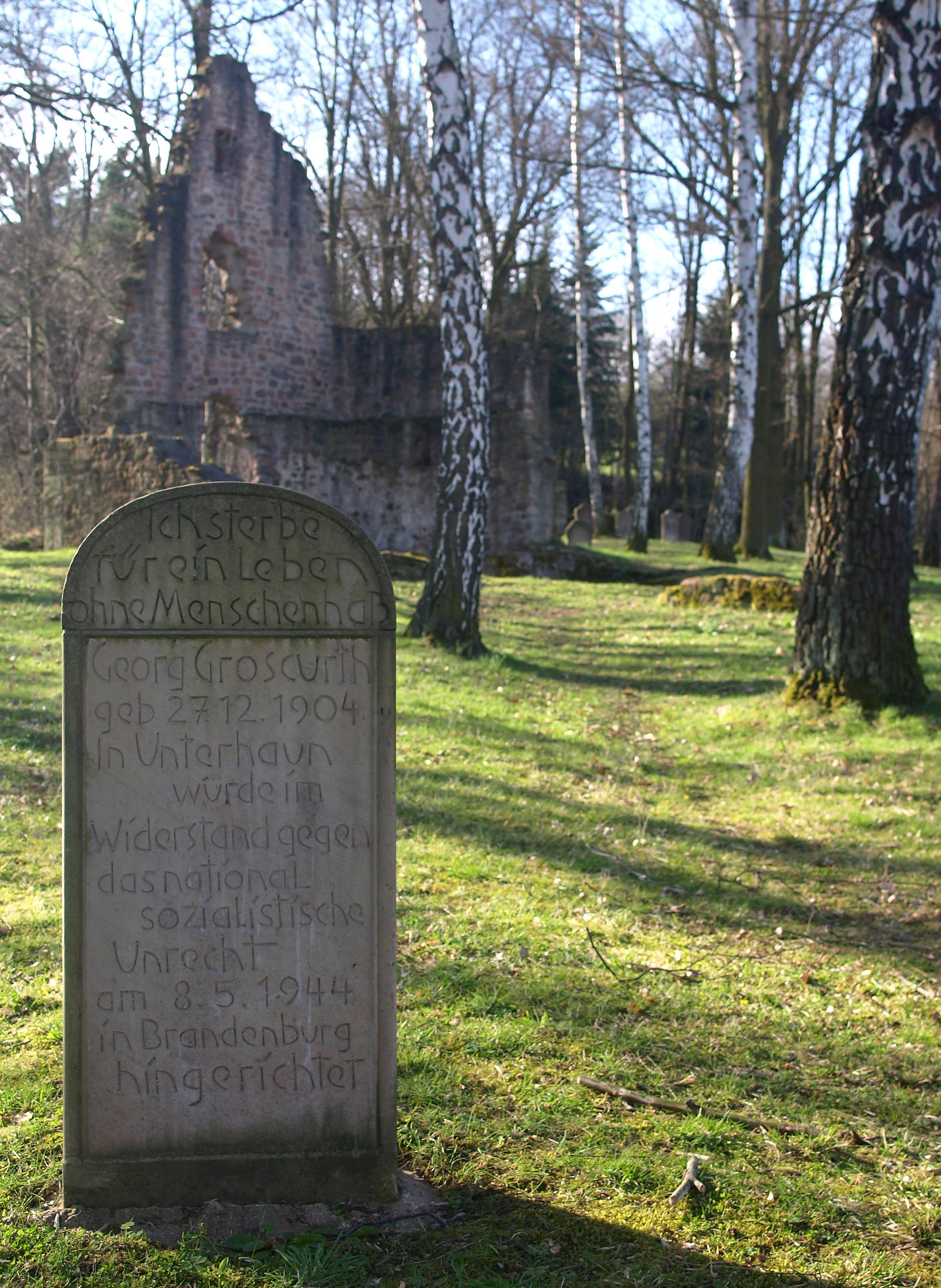
Memorial stone for Georg Groscurth at Unterhaun cemetery

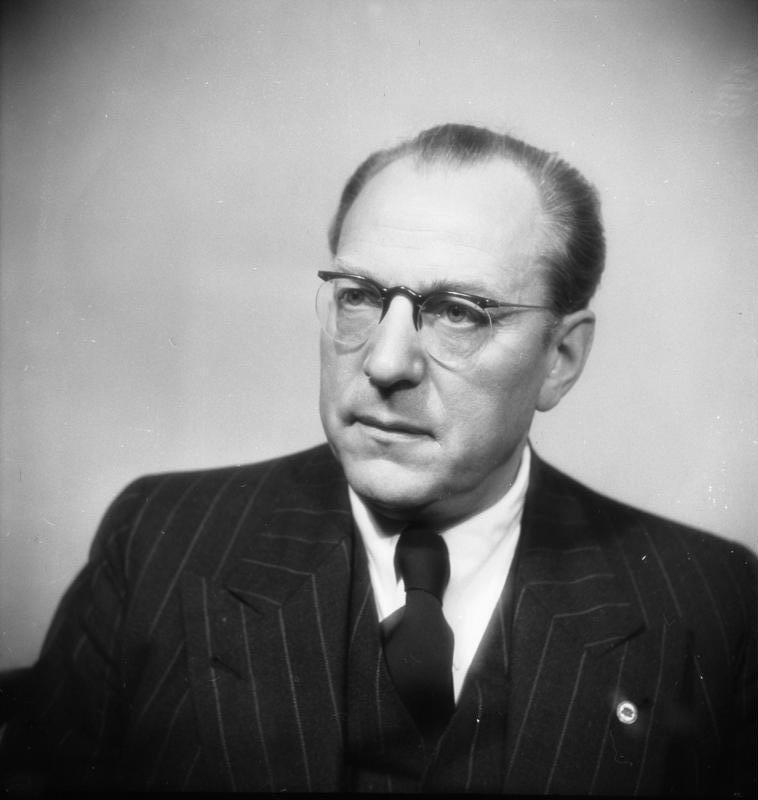
Otto Grotewohl

- Johann Gahr (1880–1939), acted alone
- Albrecht Gaiswinkler (1905–1979), Special Operations Executive spy
- Clemens August Graf von Galen (1878–1946), Catholic church
- Willi Gall (1908–1941), KPD
- Jakob Gapp (1897–1943), Catholic church
- Martin Gauger (1905–1941), Confessing Church, Kreisau Circle
- Lisa Gavric (1907–1974), Résistance
- Herta Geffke (1893–1973), Rote Hilfe
- Ludwig Gehm (1905–2002), ISK, ELAS
- Johann Gerdes (1896–1933), KPD
- Fritz Gerlich (1883–1934), journalist
- Kurt Gerstein (1905–1945), Waffen-SS, Gerstein Report author
- Eugen Gerstenmaier (1906–1986), Confessing Church
- Johann Geusendam (1866–1945), Rote Hilfe
- Etty Gingold (1916–2001), KPD
- Peter Gingold (1916–2006), KPD
- Karl Gitzoller (1905–2002), Willy-Fred
- Helene Glatzer (1902–1935), KPD
- Gerhard Gleißberg (1905–1973), SPD
- Paul Gmeiner (1892–1944), KPD
- Erich Gniffke (1895–1964) SPD
- Albert Goldenstedt (1912–1994), KPD, Rote Hilfe
- Carl Friedrich Goerdeler (1884–1945), DVNP, Mayor of Leipzig
- Joseph Götz (1895–1933), KPD
- Rudi Goguel (1908–1976), KPD
- Kurt Julius Goldstein (1914–2007), KPD
- Albert Göring (1895–1966), businessman and younger brother of Nazi leader Hermann
- Bernhard Göring (1897–1949), AfA-Bund, Neu Beginnen, Covenant of Religious Socialists of Germany
- Herta Gotthelf (1902–1963), SPD
- Hugo Gräf (1892–1958), Rote Hilfe
- Willi Graf (1918–1943), White Rose
- Josef Hans Grafl (1921–2008), Special Operations Executive spy
- Kurt Gregor (1907–1990), Rote Hilfe
- Karl Grönsfelder (1882–1964), KPD
- Maria Grollmuß (1896–1944), SPD
- Anneliese Groscurth (1910–1996), European Union (resistance group)
- Georg Groscurth (1904–1944), European Union (resistance group)
- Helmuth Groscurth (1898–1943) Wehrmacht and Abwehr officer
- Rudolf Grosse (1905–1942), KPD
- Otto Grotewohl (1894–1964), SPD
- Karl Gruber (1912–1945), London "Free Germans" of the OSS (precursor to the CIA)
- Karl Grünberg (1891–1972), KPD
- Hanno Günther (1921–1942), Rote Pfadfinder
- Gustav Gundelach (1888–1962), KPD
- Rudolf Gyptner (1925–1944), KPD

== H ==
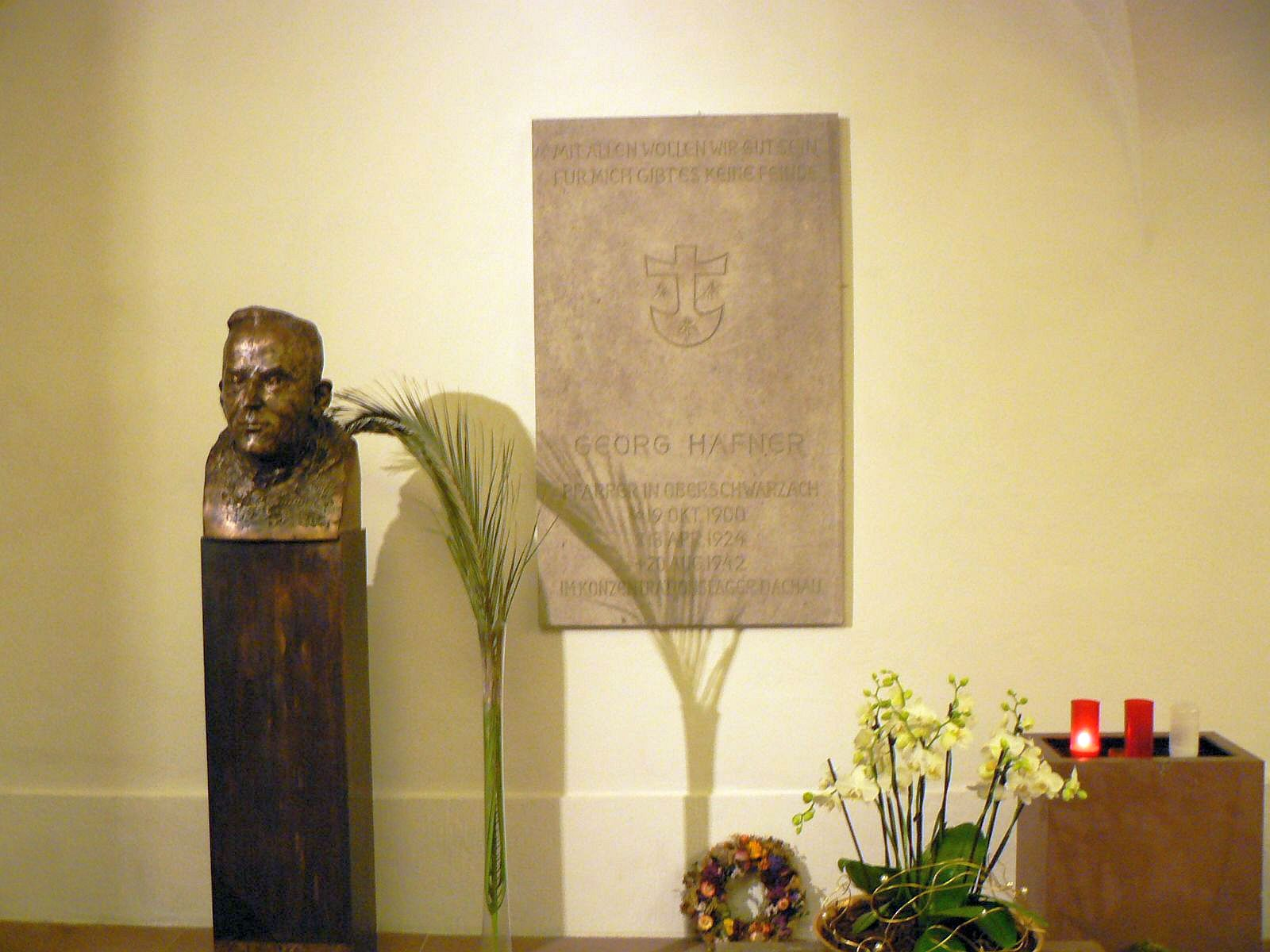
Häfner's tomb in the crypt of the Neumünster in 2010 - it is now differently marked with a modern sculpture

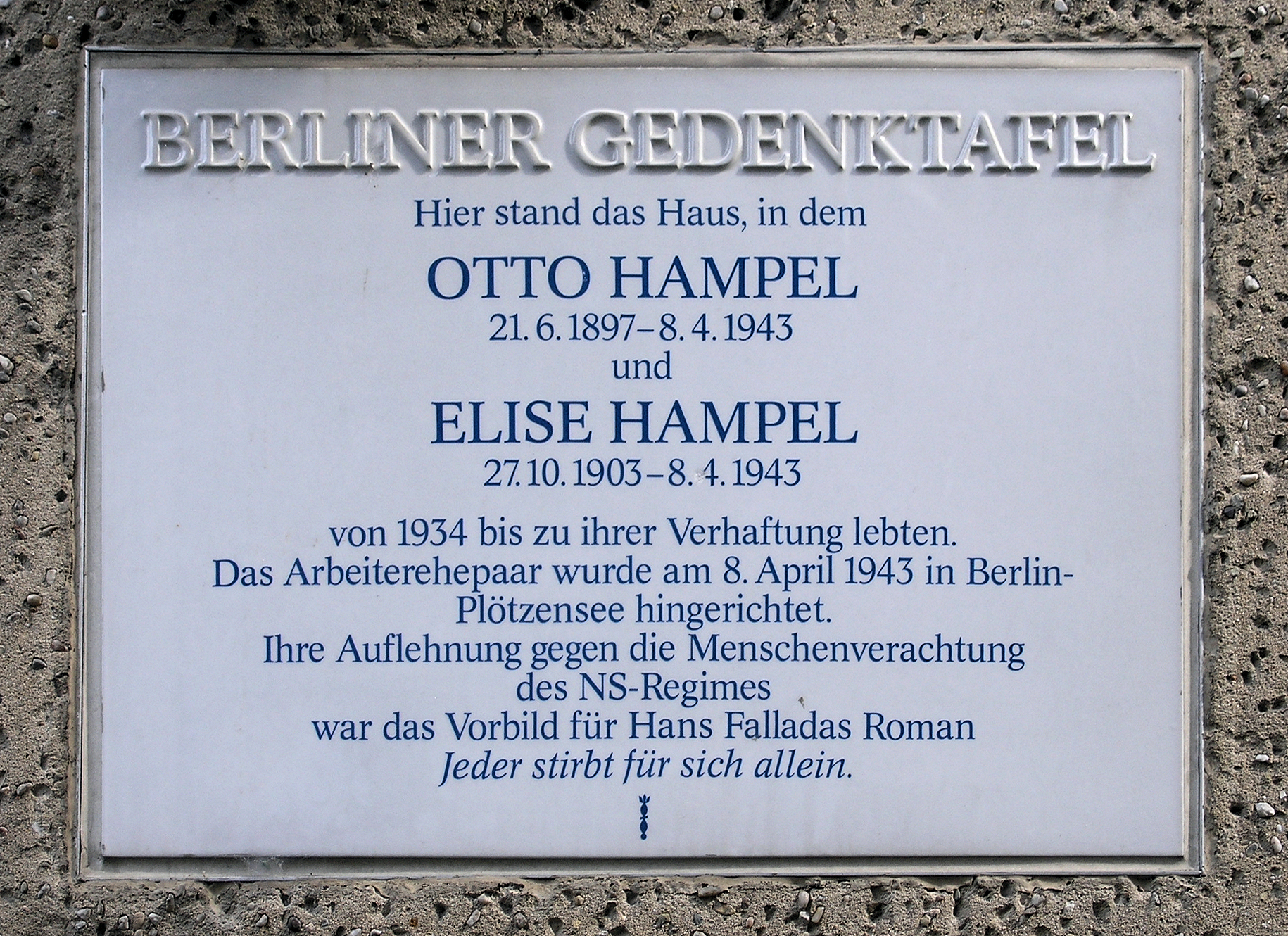
Memorial plaque at the site of the Hampels' former residence, Amsterdamer Straße 10 in Berlin

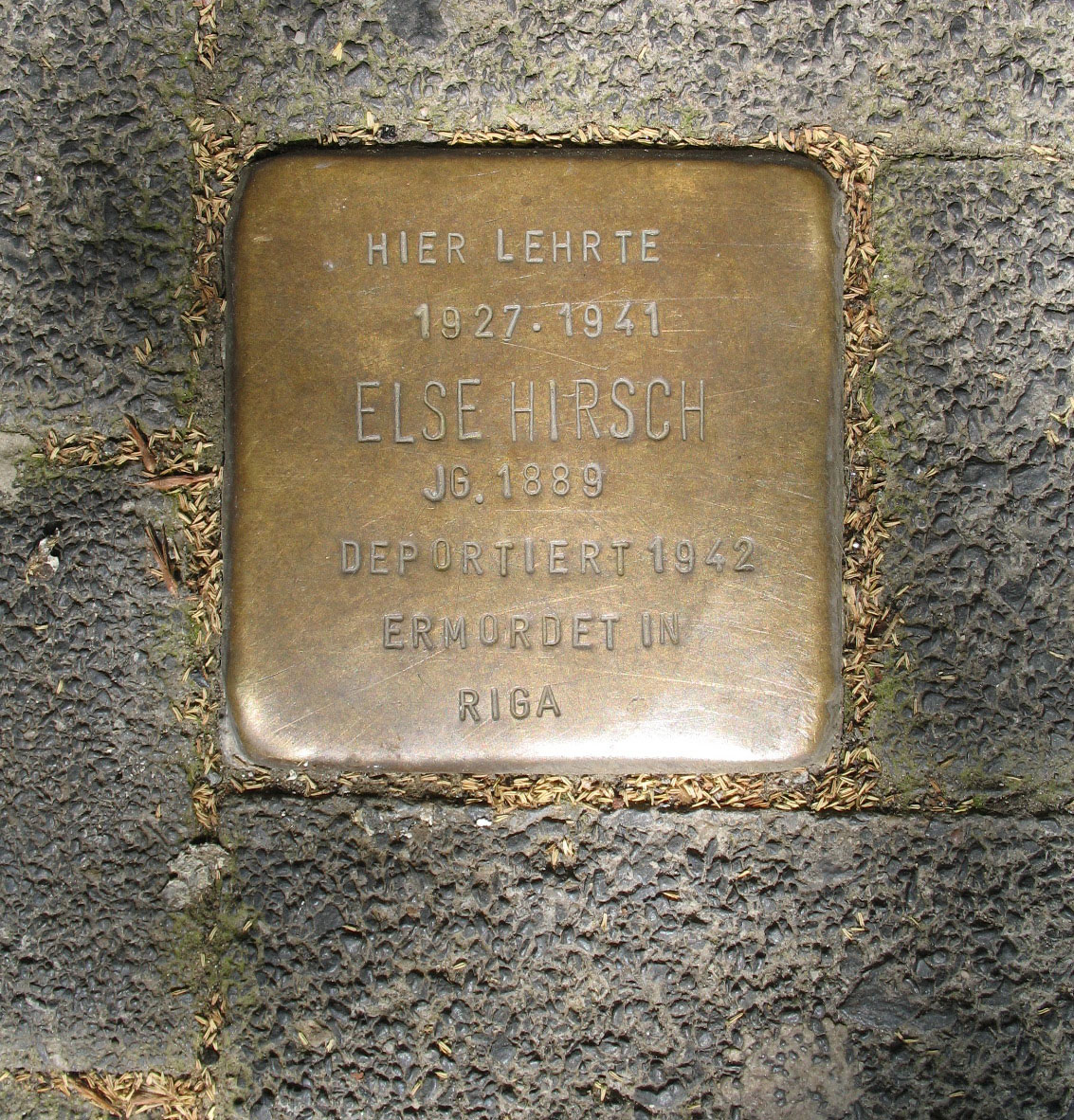
Stolperstein for Else Hirsch on sidewalk in downtown Bochum

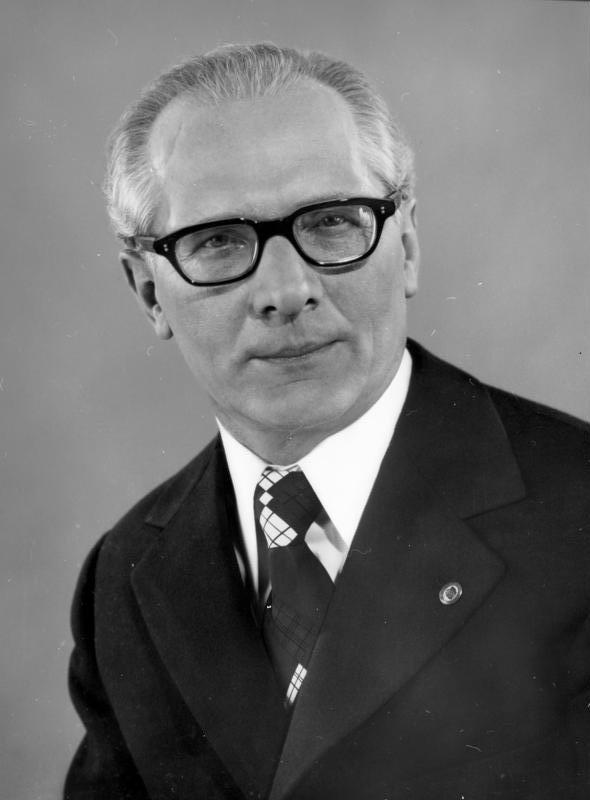
Erich Honecker

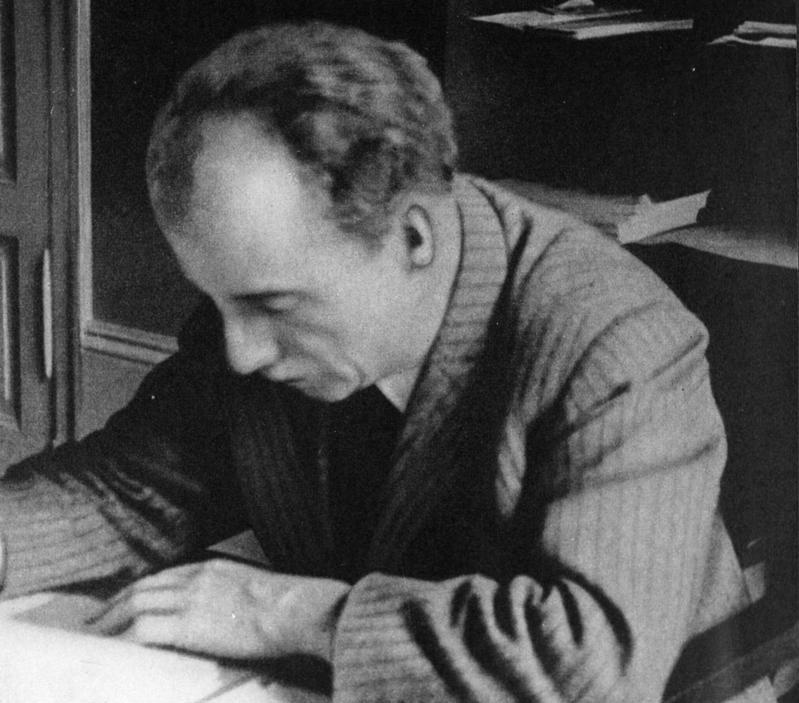
Kurt Huber

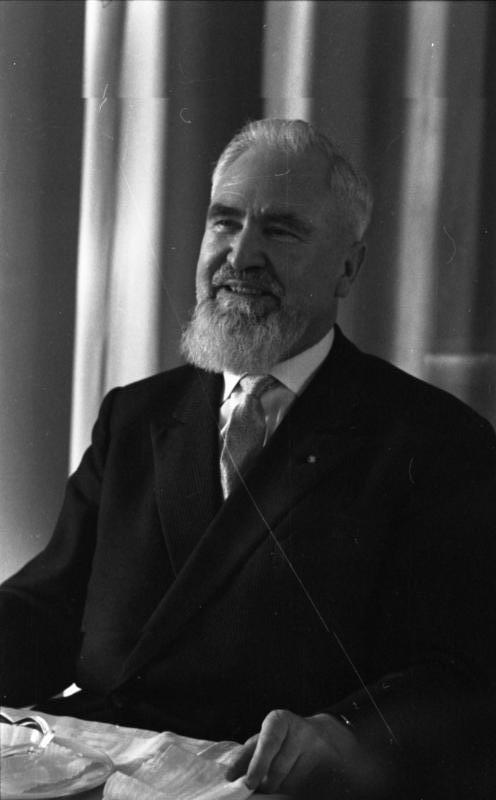
Alois Hundhammer

- Georg Häfner (1900–1942), Catholic church
- Kurt Hälker (1922–2010), Résistance
- Otto Halle (1903–1987), KPD
- Elise Hampel (1903–1943), acted alone with husband Otto
- Ernst Hampel (1919–1945), part of the Etter-Rose-Hampel group
- Otto Hampel, (1897–1943), acted alone with wife Elise
- Arvid Harnack (1901–1942), Rote Kapelle (Red Orchestra)
- Werner Hansen (1905–1972), ISK
- Rudolf Harlaß (1892–1944), KPD
- Ulrich von Hassell (1881–1944), 20 July plot
- Elli Hatschek (1901–1944) European Union (resistance group)
- Paul Hatschek (1888–1944) European Union (resistance group)
- Theodor Haubach (1896–1945), SPD
- Hans Hauschulz (1912–1951), Rote Hilfe
- Erich Hausen (1900–1973), KPO
- Ernst Hegewisch (1881–1952), Rote Hilfe
- Georg D. Heidingsfelder (1899–1967), Catholic church
- Rudolf-Ernst Heiland (1910–1965), IKD
- Ernst Heilmann (1881–1940), SPD
- Karl Heinrich (1890–1946), SPD, Reichsbanner
- Joachim Heinrichs (1889–1955), Bekennende Kirche
- Willi Heinze (1910–1944), KPD, Robert Uhrig Group
- Bernhard Heinzmann (1903–1942), Catholic church
- Walter Held (1910–1942), IKD
- Georg Henke (1908–1986), KPD
- Albert Hensel (1895–1942), KPD
- Liselotte Herrmann (1909–1938), KPD
- Theo Hespers (1903–1943)
- Karl Hetz (b. 1906), National Committee for a Free Germany
- Heinz Heydrich (1905–1944), younger brother of Reinhard Heydrich ("The Butcher of Prague")
- Friedrich Hielscher (1902–1990), Konservative Revolution
- Rainer Hildebrandt (1914–2004), Haushofer-Kreis
- Else Himmelheber (1905–1944), resistance group in Schlotterbeck aus Luginsland
- Oskar Hippe (1900–1990), Trotzkyist
- Else Hirsch (1889–1942 or 1943), schoolteacher, organized 10 children's transports out of Germany
- Michael Hirschberg (1889–1937), SPD
- Walter Hochmuth (1904–1979), KPD
- Clemens Högg (1880–1945), SPD
- Josef Höhn (1902–1945), Saefkow-Jacob-Bästlein Organization
- Erich Honecker (1912–1994), KPD
- Hans Hornberger (d. 1944), KPD
- Wilm Hosenfeld (1895–1952), Nazi Captain who hid and rescued many Polish people, including Władysław Szpilman
- Kurt Huber (1893–1943), White Rose
- Helmuth Hübener (1925–1942), Hamburg Vierergruppe (German Resistance)
- Walter Huder (1921–2002)
- Alois Hundhammer (1900–1974), at the time, the youngest member of the Bavarian Landtag
- Peter Hüppeler (1913–1944), Ehrenfeld Group

== I ==
- Karl Ibach (1915–1990), KPD
- Hans Ils (1906–1988), Socialist Workers' Party of Germany
- Max Ingberg (1904–1983), SPD, party chairman of Sopade, Belgium

== J ==
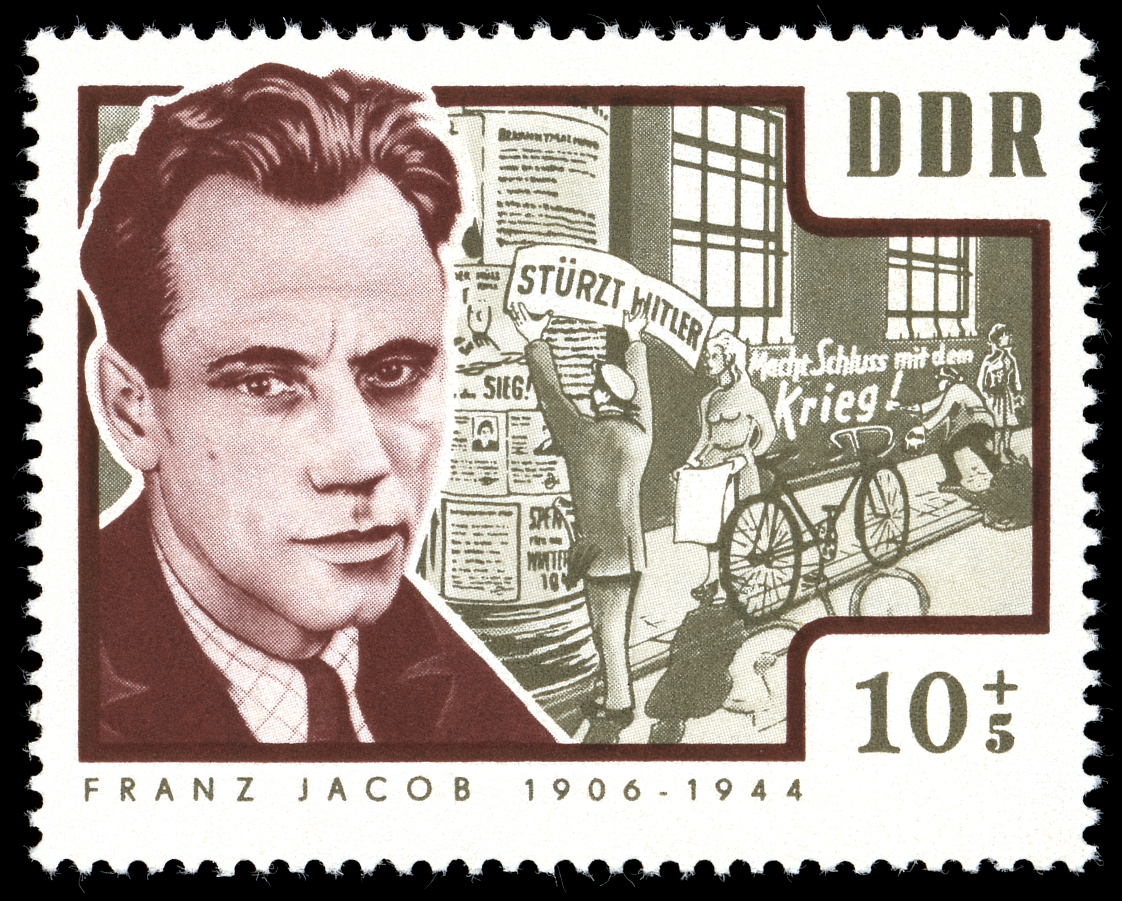
Franz Jacob, 1964 stamp from the DDR

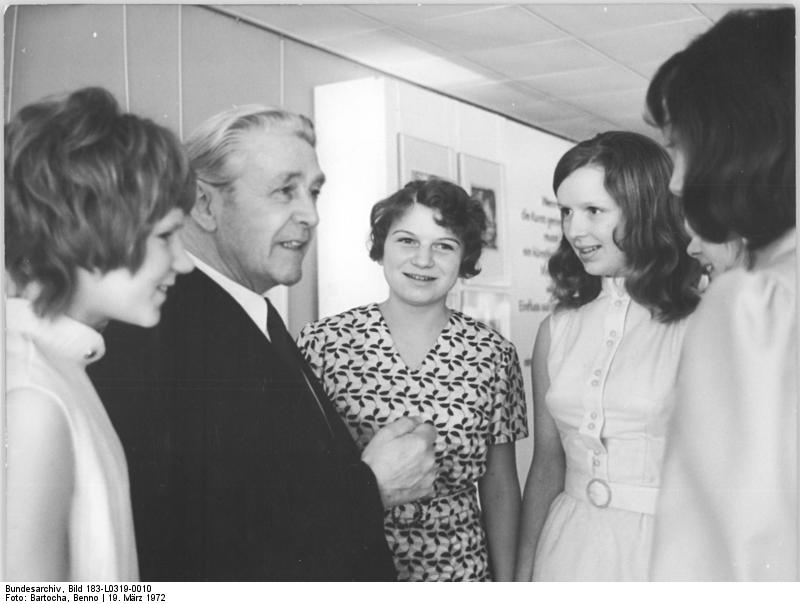
Hans Jendretzky during a Jugendweihe, 1972

- Franz Jacob (1906–1944), KPD, Bästlein-Jacob-Abshagen Group, Saefkow-Jacob-Bästlein Organization
- Katharina Jacob (1907–1989), KPD, Bästlein-Jacob-Abshagen Group
- Matthias Jacobs (1885–1935), elected legislator from Prussia SPD
- Rudolf Jacobs (1914–1944), (in Italy, naval officer, partisan in Italy with "Ugo Muccini" Garibaldi brigade)
- Hildegard Jadamowitz (1916–1942), KPD, Herbert Baum Group
- Franz Jägerstätter (1907–1943), Austrian conscientious objector
- Frieda (Friedel) and Rudolf Jahn (d. 1951), Covenant of Religious Socialists of Germany
- Hans Jahn (1885–1960), International Transport Workers' Federation
- Julius von Jan (1897–1964), Confessing Church
- Hans Jendretzky (1897–1992), KPD
- Marianne Joachim (1921–1943), Herbert Baum Group
- Anton Joos (1900–1999), KPD
- Alfred Jung (1908–1944), KPD
- Franz Jung (1888–1963), KAPD and Rote Kämpfer
- Karl Jungbluth (1903–1945), KPD
- Georg Jungclas (1902–1975), IKD

== K ==
- Otto Kahn-Freund (1900–1979) Jurist
- Gustav Ritter von Kahr (1862-1934)
- Jakob Kaiser (1888–1961) Zentrumspartei
- Hellmut Kalbitzer (1913–2006), ISK
- Heinz Kapelle (1913–1941), KPD
- Josef Kappius (1907–1967), ISK and Independent Socialist Union
- Erich Kästner (1899 – 1974), author of The Parent Trap
- Friedrich Kellner (1885–1970), SPD
- Kilian Kirchhoff (1892–1944), Catholic church
- Johanna Kirchner (1884–1944), SPD, Rote Hilfe
- Ernst Kirchweger (1898–1965), KPÖ
- Heinz Kiwitz (1910–1938), ASSO
- Michael Kitzelmann (1916–1942), Lieutenant in the Wehrmacht
- Erich Klausener (1885–1934), Zentrumspartei, Catholic church
- Reinhold Kleinlein (1883–1944), KPD
- Walter Klingenbeck (1924–1943), Munich Vierergruppe (German Resistance)
- Heinrich Kloppers (1891–1944), Reichsbanner Schwarz-Rot-Gold and Protestant teenagers' group
- Rudolf Klug (1905–1944), KPD
- Wilhelm Knöchel (1899–1944), KPD
- Waldemar von Knoeringen (1906–1971), SPD, Neu Beginnen
- Ferdinand Kobitzki (1893–1944), KPD
- Gertrud Koch (1924–2016), Edelweißpiraten
- Hans Koch (1893–1945), Jurist, Confessing Church
- Werner Koch (1910–1994), Pastor, Confessing Church, brother of Hans Koch
- Ludwig Koch (1909–2002), ISK
- Bernard Koenen (1889–1964), Rote Hilfe and National Committee for a Free Germany
- Otto Kohlhofer (1915–1988), Rote Hilfe
- Olga Körner (1887–1969), KPD
- Fritz Kolbe (1900–1971), acted alone
- Otto Korfes (1889–1964), National Committee for a Free Germany
- Werner Kowalski (1901–1943), KPD
- Walter Kraemer (1892–1941), KPD
- Walter Krajnc (1916–1944), Austrian Catholic, supported French Resistance (acting alone)
- Hilde Kramer (1900–1974), SAPD
- Heinrich Kratina (1906–1944), Ehrenfeld Group
- Wilhelm Kratz (1902–1944), Ehrenfeld Group
- Gerhard Krause (1887–1950)
- Johann Krausen (1887–1944), Ehrenfeld Group
- Willi Kreikemeyer (1894–1950), KPD
- Felix Kreissler (1917–2004), Résistance
- Lothar Kreyssig (1898–1986), Jurist (only judge to intervene in Aktion T4 euthanasia operation), Confessing Church
- Otto Kropp (1907–1937), KPD
- Maria Krüger (1907–1987), Rote Hilfe
- Alfred Kubel (1909–1999), ISK
- Adam Kuckhoff (1887–1943), Red Orchestra
- Greta Kuckhoff (1902–1981), Red Orchestra
- Heinz Kühn (1912–1992), SPD
- Otto Kühne (1893–1955), KPD and Résistance
- Hansheinrich Kummerow (1903–1944), spy
- Ingeborg Kummerow (1912–1943), spy
- Karl Kunger (1901–1943), KPD
- Albert Kuntz (1896–1945), KPD
- Erich Kurz (1895–1944), KPD
- Erich Kuttner (1887–1942), RSD

== L ==
- Max Lackmann (1910–2000), Protestant Church in Germany
- Karl Ladé (1909–1944) KPD
- Erwin von Lahousen (1897–1955) military resistance
- Fritz Lange (1898–1981), Independent Social Democratic Party of Germany, KPD, Rotfrontkämpferbund
- Paul Langen (1893–1945)
- Käthe Latzke (d. 1945), KPD
- Julius Leber (1891–1945), SPD
- Ernst Lehmann (1908–1945), SPD
- Heinz Leidersdorf (1906–1943), IKD
- Hans Conrad Leipelt (1921–1945), White Rose
- Josef Lenzel (1890–1942), Catholic church
- Theodor Lessing (1872–1933), acted alone
- Bruno Max Leuschner (1910–1965), KPD
- Wilhelm Leuschner (1890–1944), SPD
- Bernhard Lichtenberg (1875–1943), Catholic church
- Hermann Lichtenegger (1900–1984), KPÖ politician
- Simone Arnold Liebster (1930), Jehovah's Witness
- Franz Maria Liedig (1900–1967)
- Max Liedtke (1894–1955) Wehrmacht major
- Rosa Lindemann (1876–1958), KPD, Rote Hilfe in Berlin-Moabit
- Herta Lindner (1920–1943), KJVD
- Ludwig Linsert (1907–1981), ISK
- Eva Lippold (1909–1994), Rote Hilfe and Saefkow-Jacob-Bästlein Organization
- Hans Litten (1903–1938)
- Paul Löbe (1875–1967), SPD
- Max Loeper (executed 1941)
- Walter Loewenheim (1896–1977), Neu Beginnen
- Roland Lorent (1920–1944), Ehrenfeld Group
- Ludwig Philipp Lude (1895–1961), SPD
- Erna Lugebiel (1898–1984)
- Rudolf Lunau (1906–1943 missing), KPD

== M ==
- Johann Maier (1906–1945) preacher, Regensburger Dom
- Heinrich Maier (1908–1945), theologian Maier-Messner-Caldonazzi Group
- Adolf Maislinger (1903–1985), KPD
- Maria von Maltzan (1909–1997), Solf Circle
- Eva Mamlok (1918–1944), Berlin Jewish resistance
- Thomas Mann (1875–1955), novelist
- Maria Restituta (née Helene Kafka) (1894–1943), Franciscan
- Hilde Meisel (Hilda Monte) (1914–1945), ISK
- Ernst Melis (1909–2007), KPD, Résistance
- August Merges (1870–1945), Kommunistische Räte-Union
- Franz Josef Messner (1896–1945), Maier-Messner-Caldonazzi Group
- Max Josef Metzger (1887–1944), Catholic church
- Alfred Meusel (1896–1960), sociologist, KPD
- Herbert Michaelis (1898–1939), lawyer, KPD, Michaelis Group
- Carlo Mierendorff (1897–1943), SPD
- Josef Miller (1883–1964), KPD, Rote Hilfe
- Helmuth James Graf von Moltke (1907–1945), founding member, Kreisau Circle
- Konrad Morgen (1909-1982), SS Investigating Judge and Reich Police Official
- Mentona Moser (1874–1971), Rote Hilfe
- Erich Mühsam (1878–1934)
- Josef Müller (1898–1979), Bavarian People's Party, Catholic resistance
- Oskar Müller (1896–1970), KPD

== N ==
- Harry Naujoks (1901–1983), KPD
- Theodor Neubauer (1890–1945), KPD
- Karl Neuhof (1891–1943), Rote Hilfe
- Johanna Niederhellmann, SPD
- Ernst Niekisch (1889–1967), publisher of Widerstand, Magazine for national revolutionary Politics
- Katja Niederkirchner (1909–1944), KPD
- Martin Niemöller (1892–1984), Confessing Church
- Karl Nolan (1891–1937), Rote Hilfe, KPD, father of Fritz and Anna Pröll (see P), one of the first Augsburg Nazi murder victims in Dachau concentration camp
- Erik Nölting (1892–1953), SPD
- Karl Nord (1912–2003) Socialist Workers' Party of Germany

== O ==
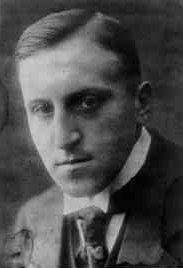
Carl von Ossietzky

- Aloys Odenthal (1912–2003), Aktion Rheinland
- Max Opitz (1890–1982), KPD
- Rudolf Opitz (1908–1939), KPD
- Friedrich Carl Freiherr von Oppenheim (1900–1978)
- Carl von Ossietzky (1889–1938)
- Hans Oster (1887–1945), Abwehr

== P ==
- Wilhelm Peetz (1892–1935)
- Resi Pesendorfer (1902–1989), Willy-Fred
- Toni Pfülf (1877–1933), member of the SPD
- Emil Phillip (1886–1965), Confessing Church
- Kurt Piehl (1928–2001), Edelweißpiraten
- Hans Pink (1906–1974), Rote Hilfe
- Menachem Pinkhof (1920–1969), Westerweel Group
- Gertrud Piter (1899–1933), KPD
- Hartmut Plaas (d. 1944), SS-Obersturmbannführer with contact with Wilhelm Canaris
- Karl Plagge (1897–1957), Wehrmacht officer, acted alone
- Philipp Pless (1906–1973), Communist Party Opposition
- Sepp Plieseis (1913–1966), KPÖ, Willy-Fred
- Felix Plewa (1906–1943), KPD
- Harald Poelchau (1903–1972), Onkel Emil Group, Confessing Church, BRSD
- Ottilie Pohl (1867–1943), USPD, Rote Hilfe in Berlin-Moabit
- Johannes Popitz (1884–1945)
- Hedwig Porschütz (1900–1977), Righteous among the Nations
- Magnus Poser (1907–1945), KPD
- Folkert Potrykus (1900–1971), KPD
- Bernard Povel (called Ben Povel) (1897–1952), Catholic textile manufacturer, Zentrumspartei
- Olga Benario-Prestes (1908–1942), KPD
- Konrad von Preysing (1880–1950), Catholic church
- Marie Priess (1885–1983), Red Orchestra
- Christoph Probst (1919–1943), White Rose
- Fritz Pröll (1915–1944), Rote Hilfe
- Elisabeth Pungs (1896–1945), Rote Hilfe

== R ==
- Josef Raab (1899–1971), KPD
- Siegfried Rädel (1893–1943), KPD
- Adolf Reichwein (1898–1944), SPD
- Franz Reinisch (1903–1942), Catholic church
- Oskar Reincke (1907–1944), Bästlein-Jacob-Abshagen Group
- Josef Reitzle (1910–1958), ELAS
- Paul Rentsch (1898–1944), European Union (resistance group)
- Franz Rheinberger (1927–1944), Ehrenfeld Group
- Albert Richter (1912–1940), track cyclist
- Josef Rieck (1911–1970), Catholic church
- Fritz Riedel (1908–1944), Robert Uhrig Group
- Jakob Ritter (1886–1951), Socialist Workers' Party of Germany
- Hans Robinsohn (1897–1981), DDP Robinsohn-Strassmann Group
- Theodor Roller (1915–2008), CVJM
- Beppo Römer (1892–1944), KPD
- Erwin Rommel (1891–1944), Wehrmacht
- Augustin Rösch (1893–1961), Kreisau Circle, Catholic church
- Joseph C. Rossaint (1902–1991), Catholic church
- Karl Rubner (1901–1988), SPD
- Anton Ruh (1912–1964), KPD
- Hermann Runge (1902–1975), SPD

== S ==
- Anton Saefkow (1903–1944), Saefkow-Jacob-Bästlein Organization
- Herbert Sandberg (1908–1991), KPD, Association of Revolutionary Visual Artists
- Willi Sänger (1894–1944), KPD
- Marie-Louise Sarre (ca. 1904–1997), Solf Circle
- Karl Schapper (1879–1941), Catholic
- Werner Scharff (1912–1945), Gemeinschaft für Frieden und Aufbau
- John Schehr (1896–1934), KPD
- Johann Schellheimer (1899–1945), KPD
- Heinrich Scheuken (1902–1944), acted alone
- Jack Schiefer (1898–1980), SPD
- Kurt Schill (1911–1944), KPD
- Emilie Schindler (1907–2001), acted alone
- Oskar Schindler (1908–1974), acted alone
- Bartholomäus (Barthel) Schink (1927–1944), Ehrenfeld Group
- Friedrich Schlotterbeck (1909–1979), KJD, KPD, Schlotterbeck Group
- Walter Schmedemann (1901–1976), SPD
- Anton Schmid (1900–1942), Wehrmacht, resistance supporter
- Richard Schmid (1899–1986), counsel, Socialist Workers' Party of Germany (affiliated)
- Otto Schmirgal (1900–1944), KPD
- Elisabeth Schmitz (1893–1977), theologian, resistance fighter, Confessing Church
- Alexander Schmorell (1917–1943), White Rose
- Paul Schneider (1897–1939), pastor, Protestant Church in Germany
- Ernst Schneller (1890–1944), KPD
- Erwin Schoettle (1899–1976), Sopade, Neu Beginnen
- Richard Schönfeld (d. 1945) KPD
- Carlo Schönhaar (1924–1942), Résistance
- Eugen Schönhaar (1898–1934), KPD
- Gustav Schönherr (1889–1933), KPD
- Hans Scholl (1918–1943), White Rose
- Sophie Scholl (1921–1943), White Rose
- Roman Karl Scholz (1912–1944), Catholic church
- Felice Schragenheim (1922–1942), unknown
- Fritz Schreiter (1892–1944), Communist Party Opposition
- Karl Schröder (1884–1950), Rote Kämpfer
- Friedrich-Werner von der Schulenburg (1875–1944), 20 July plot
- Fritz-Dietlof von der Schulenburg (1902–1944), 20 July plot
- Eduard Schulte (1891–1966), industrialist, acted alone
- Jakob Schultheis (1891–1945), Speyerer Kameradschaft
- Josef Schulz (1909?–1941), Wehrmacht (disputed)
- Fiete Schulze (1894–1935), KPD
- Eva Schulze-Knabe (1907–1976), KPD
- Elisabeth Schumacher (1904–1942) Red Orchestra
- Kurt Schumacher (sculptor) (1905–1942) Red Orchestra
- Georg Schumann (resistance fighter) (1886–1945), KPD
- Margarete Schütte-Lihotzky (1897–2000), KPÖ
- Adolf Schütz (1926–1944), Ehrenfeld Group
- Alexander Schwab (1887–1943), Rote Kämpfer
- Günther Schwarz (1928–1944), Ehrenfeld Group
- Rudolf Schwarz (resistance activist) (1904–1934), KPD
- Werner Seelenbinder (1904–1944), KPD
- Willi Seng (1909–1944), KPD functionary
- Robert Siewert (1887–1973), KPO, Buchenwald Resistance
- Georg Singer (1898–1942), KPD
- Konrad Skrentny (1894–1955), KPD
- Hanna Solf (1884–1954), Solf Circle
- Friedrich zu Solms-Baruth (1886–1951)
- Richard Sorge (1895–1944), KPD spy for the Soviet Union
- Ulrich Sporleder (1911–1944) Confessing Church
- Claus von Stauffenberg (1907–1944), 20 July plot
- Karl Stein (resistance fighter) (1902–1942), KPD
- Wilhelm Stein (d. 1944), KPD
- Hans Steinbrück (1921–1944), Ehrenfeld Group
- Werner Steinbrink (1917–1942), Young Communist League of Germany, Herbert Baum Group
- Erich Steinfurth (1896–1934), Rote Hilfe
- Franz Stenzer (1900–1933), KPD
- Ernst Strassmann (1897–1958), DDP, Robinsohn-Strassmann Group
- Stefan Szende (1901–1985), Socialist Workers' Party of Germany
- Carl Szokoll (1915–2004), Wehrmacht, Operation Radetzky

== T ==
- Elisabeth von Thadden (1890–1944), Solf Circle
- Bruno Tesch (1913–1933), KPD
- Ernst Thälmann (1886–1944), KPD
- Fritz Theilen (1927–2012), Ehrenfeld Group
- Matthias Theisen (1885–1933), KPD, SPD
- Paul Thümmel (1902–1945), Abwehr, Czech Resistance
- Paul Tillich (1886–1965), Christian Socialist, American Friends of German Freedom, Council for a Democratic Germany
- Henning von Tresckow
- Walter Trier (1890–1951), illustrator of The Parent Trap

== U ==
- Max Urich (1890–1968), unionist resistance (DMV)
- Robert Uhrig (1903–1944), KPD

== V ==
- Kurt Vieweg (1911–1976), KPD
- Franz Vogt (1899–1940), labour unionist, SPD, Reichsbanner Schwarz-Rot-Gold
- Dietrich von Hildebrand (1889-1977), founder and editor of anti-Nazi weekly paper, Der Christliche Ständestaat ("The Christian Corporative State")

== W ==
- Maria Wachter (1910–2010), KPD
- Bebo Wager (1905–1943), SPD
- Heinrich Wagner (1886–1945), KPD, Rote Hilfe
- Jacob Walcher (1887–1970), Socialist Workers' Party of Germany
- Rudolf Wascher (1904–1956), KPD
- Eduard Wald (1905–1978), Committee for Proletarian Unity
- Orli Wald (1914–1962), Young Communist League of Germany, "Angel of Auschwitz"
- Maria von Wedemeyer (1924–1977), Confessing Church
- Paul Wegmann (1889–1945), from SPD- and Socialist Workers' Party of Germany, member of existing resistance group in Zeitz
- Armin T. Wegner (1886–1978), author, medic, soldier and human rights activist, acted alone
- Herbert Wehner (1906–1990), KPD
- Otto Weidt (1883–1947), anarchist resistance
- Arthur Weisbrodt (1909–1944), Rote Hilfe
- Friedrich Weißler (1891–1937), Confessing Church
- Ludwig Wellhausen (1884–1940), SPD
- Wilhelm Wester (1889–1960), Lutheran pastor
- Hans Westermann (1890–1935), Versöhnler, KPD
- Alexander Westermayer (1894–1944), European Union (resistance group)
- Max Westphal (1895–1942), SPD
- Karl August Wiedenhofen (1888–1958), Aktion Rheinland
- Albert Willimsky (1890–1940), Catholic church
- Jürgen George Wittenstein, White Rose
- Josef Wirmer (1901–1944), Catholic church
- Irmgard von Witzleben (1896–1944), artist, acted alone
- Hans Wölfel (1902–1944), Catholic church
- Edith Wolff (1904–1997), Zionist refugee helper in Berlin
- Rosi Wolfstein (1888–1987), Socialist Workers' Party of Germany

== Z ==
- Gerhard Zadek (1919–2005), Hashomer Hatzair, Herbert Baum Group
- Hiltgunt Zassenhaus (1916–2004), wartime translator and interpreter
- Zita Zehner (1900–1978), home economist and radio host
- Johannes Zieger (1910–1981), KPD
- Karl Zimmet (1895–1969) Antinazistische Deutsche Volksfront
- Karl Zink (1910–1940), KPD

== See also ==
- German Resistance
- Stolpersteine
- List of members of the 20 July plot
- Resistance during World War II
- Friedrich Olbricht
- Kurt Nehrling
- Rudolf Christoph Freiherr von Gersdorff
- Werner Dankwort
- List of cities by country that have Stolpersteine
- List of Righteous among the Nations by country
