= Covenant of Religious Socialists of Germany =

German organisation

The Covenant of Religious Socialists of Germany (Bund der Religiösen Sozialistinnen und Sozialisten Deutschlands, BRSD) is an organization of German Protestants who are working for a socialist society. It was founded in 1926 and was banned during the Nazi era (1933–1945), but reconstituted itself again, after the war.

== Goals ==
The goals of the BRSD are the separation of church and state, the democratization of the church, the political neutrality of the church, non-denominational schools, an end of the chaplaincy and for the church to work for peace and international understanding.

== Nazi Resistance ==
The BRSD positioned itself squarely against National Socialism. It referred to Nazism as "pre-Christian, heathen destructive power' and criticized the ideological glorification of violence by the Nazis. As with other socialist organizations, the Federation was banned once the Nazis seized power, however, various members of the organization formed resistance groups, such as Erich Kürschner in Berlin.

== After 1945 ==
After the Second World War, the BRSD was re-founded. The group in the Soviet occupation zone disintegrated after 1946. The organization in West Germany was marginialized because of the Cold War, but was able to revitalize itself after 1968. Today, the BRSD is a member of the Attac network, of Oikocredit, Kairos Europa, and the International League of Religious Socialists.

== See also ==
- Christian socialism
- List of Germans who resisted Nazism
