= Franz Vogt =

Former German trade unionist

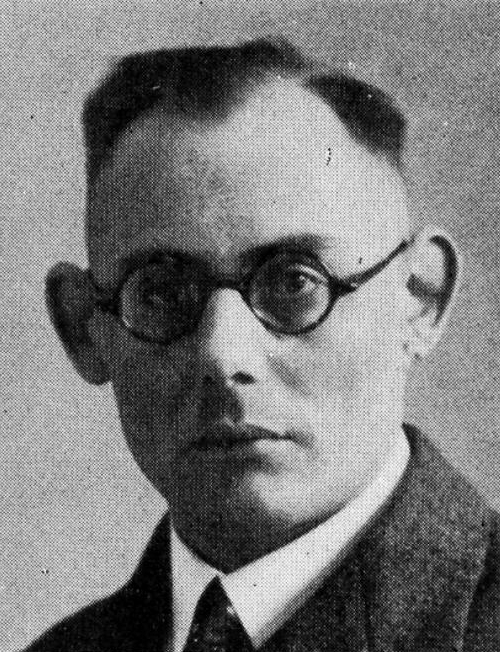
Vogt c. 1932

Franz Vogt (9 October 1899 – 14 May 1940) was a German trade unionist, Social Democrat and member of the German resistance against the Nazi regime.

== Life ==
Vogt was chairman of the Reichsbanner Schwarz-Rot-Gold in Bochum and secretary of the economic-political department of the Bergbauindustriearbeiterverbandes ("Mining Industry Workers' Union"). In 1932, he served in the Landtag of Prussia as a representative from the Social Democratic Party (SPD). As an active member of the SPD and the head of the Reichsbanner, Vogt was on the front lines of the frequent confrontations with the growing Nazi movement. Following the Nazis' seizure of power in 1933 Vogt and his family moved to the Saarland, which was not then in the German Reich. However, shortly afterwards, Saarland was reintegrated into the Reich, causing Vogt to flee again, this time to the Netherlands.

In Amsterdam, he was a member of the German exile group, the Freie Presse ("Free Press") and published the Bergarbeiter-Mitteilungen ("Mine Workers' Newsletter") and Bergarbeiter-Zeitung ("Mine Workers' Newspaper"). He became a member of the executive committee of the Miners' International Federation (MIF) in 1938. He helped establish the Arbeitsausschuss freigewerkschaftlicher Bergarbeiter Deutschland ("Working Committee of the Mine Workers of Germany") in Paris and became the secretary of that organization.

Vogt took his own life when Germany invaded and overran the Netherlands in early May 1940.

== Legacy ==
In 1983 the city of Bochum decided to name a street in his honor. Franz-Vogt-Straße is located close to where Vogt and his family once lived.

== See also ==
- List of Germans who resisted Nazism
