= Bruno Bachler =

German communist resistance fighter against Nazism (1924-2015)

- Born: 9 October 1924
- Died: 15 November 2015 (aged 91)
- Occupation: communist resistance fighter against Nazism
- Known for: part of the Edelweiss Pirates

Bruno Bachler (9 October 1924 – 15 November 2015) was a German communist resistance fighter against Nazism, prisoner in the Buchenwald concentration camp and party functionary of the KPD. He is most well known for being part of the Edelweiss Pirates.

== Life ==
Bachler grew up in an East Prussian communist-oriented family, which was also active against the rise of Nazism after moving from Insterburg to Duisburg. Bruno was a member of the Red Young Pioneers as a child. His father was taken into "protective custody" on 27 February 1933, on the night of the Reichstag fire, and sent to one of the early concentration camps, where he died as a result of his imprisonment.

After the outbreak of World War II, he joined the Edelweiss Pirates, a resistant youth group. When this membership became known, the public prosecutor's office investigated him. After passing his journeyman's examination in 1942, he was called up to the Wehrmacht. During his recruit training, he secretly collected leaflets dropped by the English, which he distributed to households in the vicinity of his barracks. He was seized and brought before a court that sentenced him to one year in prison with front-line probation. Initially he was interned for a quarter of a year in the Buchenwald concentration camp, after which he was assigned to the penal company of the 16th Panzer Division on the Eastern Front and used there for mine clearance.

After the end of the war, Bachler returned to Duisburg in 1945. Here he was one of the founding members of the KPD. In addition, he gathered young people in the group Neue Jugend around him and founded the Freie Deutsche Jugend in Duisburg in 1946. When it was banned in the Federal Republic of Germany in 1951, he continued to work illegally. He was arrested again and sentenced to three months in prison. Even after the KPD was banned in 1956, he was again imprisoned for three months for illegally continuing political work in the sense of high treason. A few years later, he was sentenced by a court to thirteen months in prison for illegal cooperation with the GDR trade union FDGB, which he spent in Kleve prison. This was followed by another five months in prison for an old offense: organizing holiday stays for children from the Federal Republic of Germany in the GDR.

Bachler took part in the Easter marches and called for protests against the Bundeswehr's military duties and actions. In meetings of the Association of the Persecuted of the Nazi Regime (VVN), he reported to young people about his resistance to the Edelweiss Pirates and about his stay in a concentration camp.

Bruno Bachler was awarded the Rheinlandtaler of the Landschaftsverband Rheinland in 2006.

== Death and legacy ==
Bahler died on 15 November 2015, at the age of 91 years old. After his death, Bachler was praised as an "upright fighter for his pacifist ideals and a convincing admonisher against fascism".
