= Fritz Dressel =

- Born: Friedrich Georg Robert Dressel; 1 June 1896; Welsberg, Bavaria, Germany
- Died: 7 May 1933 (aged 36)
- Occupation: Political activist
- Spouse: Dorothea "Dora" Dressel (1897-1993)
- Children: Fritz Dressel (son)

Fritz Dressel (1 June 1896 – 7 May 1933) was a Communist Party activist in Bavaria, Germany.

Dressel died in the concentration camp at Dachau. His was one of the first concentration camp deaths to be widely reported after the Nazis took power in Germany, although differences of interpretation persisted over whether he had committed suicide in the concentration camp, as stated on his death certificate, or was "beaten to death", as baldly reported in an English newspaper as early as 1934.

== Life ==
=== Early years ===
Friedrich Georg Robert Dressel was born in Welsberg, close to Coburg in northern Bavaria, and grew up in nearby Schottenstein. He was the eldest son of a carpenter in the village, and after attending school locally he learned his father's trade. Directly before the war he embarked on a period of itinerant work, during which he worked for the Krupp steel conglomerate in Essen. Between 1914 and 1918 he had to participate in the fighting, serving in both France and Russia. He suffered serious injury, however, which led to a lengthy stay in hospital, after which he became a munitions worker in Munich.

Dressel also, in 1916, married his partner Dorothea (Dora). Their son, also called Fritz, had been born on 26 August 1914. The end of the war found the family living in a tiny apartment in Freimann, which was part of the north Munich suburb of Schwabing. Freimann was also the location of the munitions factory, recently opened as a branch operation by Krupp, where Dressel was still working in 1918.

=== Politics ===
During the revolutionary year that followed the war Fritz Dressel attended a succession of political meetings locally, eventually himself hesitantly addressing a workers' meeting in Schwabing. In 1919 he joined the newly formed German Communist Party, becoming a party organiser for South Bavaria. Dressel was away from Munich, visiting his parents in the north of Bavaria, when Eisner was assassinated in February 1919, and he missed out on the subsequent street violence which involved the killings of hundreds of socialists, communists and trades unionists. His political involvement nevertheless intensified, which led to frequent encounters with the ultra-conservative Bavarian police and justice services. In March 1921 he received a two-year prison sentence after organising a rally in Munich to protest against the life sentence recently conferred on the communist leader Max Hoelz. However, Dressel was released and placed on probation after serving fifteen months of his two-year sentence.

In November 1923 the German Communist Party was briefly declared illegal and Dressel relocated temporarily to Berlin where he continued his party activities. By January 1924 he was in Frankfurt where he was arrested and imprisoned for eight weeks. He was arrested again in September 1924 after attending a meeting at which a fellow party member reported on a recent visit to the Soviet Union. The Communist Party was no longer banned in Germany, however, and after a few days he was released for lack of evidence against him.

In 1925 he returned to work as the party secretary of the South Bavarian district Communist Party, which for a time he led. During this period he also served as an officer of the Wood Workers' Union and became involved with the consumer-co-operative movement. In 1927 he attended a training course at the Communist Party Academy in Hohnstein, a short distance to the east of Dresden.

Between 1928 and 1933 he sat as a member of the Bavarian Regional Parliament (Landtag), leading the small Communist group in it. In March 1929 Fritz Dressel and Herbert Müller (activist) organised a protest demonstration by Munich's unemployed workers. His parliamentary immunity was lifted and he was sentenced to several months of detention.

=== Nazi Germany ===
Régime change came in January 1933 and the new government lost little time in establishing one-party dictatorship in Germany. A couple of weeks later, on 9 February 1933, Fritz Dressel made a speech in the Bavarian Landtag in which he was highly critical of the government's newly introduced labour service obligation (Arbeitsdienstpflicht). Presciently, and using chilling language, he predicted that this was part of a step by step strategy to militarize the young people affected. In April 1933 Dressel held a meeting with the local gauleiter, Adolf Wagner in order to protest about the terror being inflicted by the Nazi party's quasi-military wing, the so-called SA. For Dressel the conversation had a personal aspect since his wife Dora had been taken into "protective custody" on 30 March 1933.

Fritz Dressel himself was arrested by the Bavarian police on 3 May 1933 and taken to the concentration camp at Dachau. His political career made Dressel a high-profile opponent of the régime and his detention was reported prominently in the "Feldmochinger Zeitung" (local newspaper).

=== Dachau ===
At the concentration camp Dressel was taken to the so-called "Arrest building" where he was kept separate from the other detainees. Over several days he was repeatedly beaten and subjected to water torture and psychological torture techniques by his SS guards. He made a feeble suicide attempt by cutting his wrists with a bread knife, and his wounds were initially bandaged. Later two SA "medical" staff, while pretending to provide assistance, removed the bandages after which Dressel was left on the floor slowly bleeding to death while his guards looked on and the camp doctor was forbidden to intervene. According to another version, Dressel was set upon by guard dogs and then left bleeding to death. The guards concluded the evening with a drunken music party.

=== Report of the death ===
Although the authorities were content for the death of Fritz Dressel to be reported as a suicide, the more graphic details emerged thanks to a fellow detainee called Hans Beimler. Beimler (who would later die fighting in the Spanish Civil War), escaped from the Concentration Camp on the night of 8/9 May after killing an SS guard and donning the man's uniform. Beimler's report of Dressler's death was included in a publication entitled "Im Mörderlager Dachau" ("In the Dachau Murder Camp") which Beimler produced in August 1933.
