= Elvira Eisenschneider =

German resistance fighter

- Born: 22 April 1924; Fischbach
- Died: 6 April 1944 (aged 19); Sachsenhausen concentration camp
- Cause of death: Shot in a concentration camp

Elvira Eisenschneider (22 April 1924 – 6 April 1944) was a German resistance fighter who served in the Red Army. She was born in Fischbach near County Birkenfield and died on 6 April in 1944 in the Sachsenhausen concentration camp.

== Early life and family ==
Soon after the Nazi Party came into power, on 7 March 1933 members of the SA were carrying out inspections during which 10 year old Elvira had to watch her mother get beat up for not revealing her father's location.

Her father, Paul Eisenschneider, took part in the October Revolution of 1918 and was part of the Communist Party of Germany, and secretary of the party in Fischbach. He was also an anti-Nazi activist. Because of this, she fled with her mother to an autonomous region known as the "Saargebiet" to avoid persecution at the age of 10.

== Life in the Soviet Union ==
The family fled to the Soviet Union where Paul Eisenschneider attended the International Lenin school in Moscow. In 1936 he returned to Germany, was arrested and convicted to a life in prison. He was killed on 19 April 1944 in the Mauthausen concentration camp.

Due to her father being arrested in Germany, and her mother being put under the supervision of doctors, Elvira Eisenschneider would be sent to the International Children's Home in Ivanovo. It was here that she became a member of the youth group Komsomol, and where she was preparing to study at the Institute of Literature in Moscow.

== Time in the Red Army ==
After the attack by the Wehrmacht on the Soviet Union, Eisenschneider trained as a medic and in autumn 1941 accompanied an evacuation transport from Moscow to Chelyabinsk.

In 1942, after her 18th birthday, she volunteered for the Red Army. She received training as a parachutist and scout and took on some partisan missions behind the front. In the summer of 1943 she parachuted from behind the front in Germany. She is said to have managed to get to the Palatinate as at least some of her radio messages were documented from there. She was arrested in the Ruhr area on February 23, 1944, and shot in a concentration camp on April 6, 1944.

== Legacy ==
- Both Elvira and Paul Eisenschneider's names are engraved on the large plaque of the memorial of the socialists in Berlin's Friedrichsfelde central cemetery in the Lichtenberg district.
- In 1961, the German Post of the GDR issued a special stamp of Elvira Eisenschneider to honour her.
- The ship ROS 404 Elvira Eisenschneider was in service from 30 September 1966 to May 1987. It was a feeder trawler of the "Artur Becker" series.
