= Agnes Asche =

German socialist who resisted the Nazis

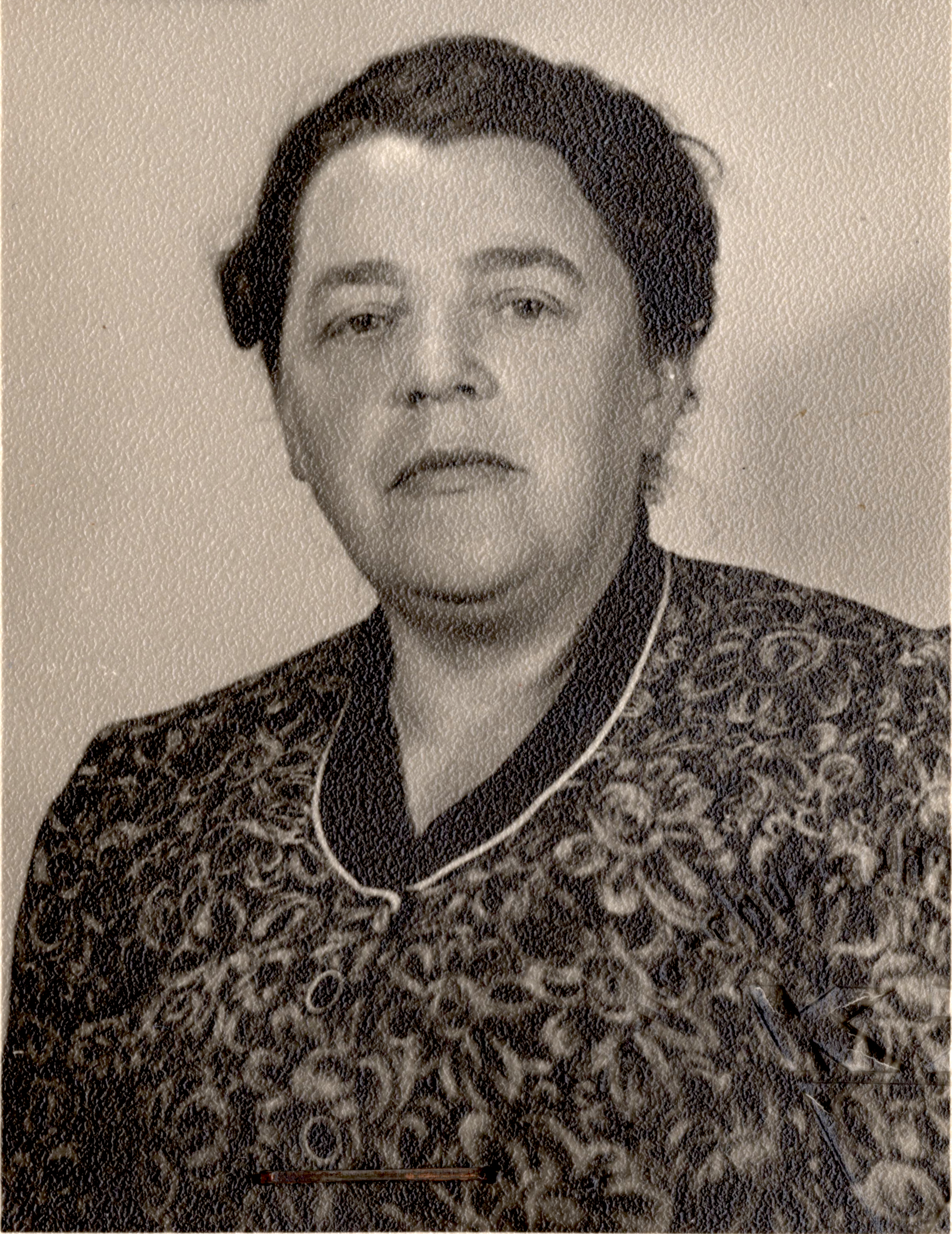
- Born: Agnes Lampe; 13 December 1891; Harsum, German Empire
- Died: 7 January 1966 (aged 74); Langenhagen, West Germany
- Other names: Agnes Bertram and Agnes Jünemann

Agnes Asche (13 December 1891 – 7 January 1966), also known as Agnes Bertram and Agnes Jünemann, was a German socialist who resisted the Nazis. A street in Hanover is named in her honor.

== Biography ==
Asche became a widow when her first husband died during World War I. From 1919 to 1923, she was active in the Sozialverband Deutschland (Social Association of Germany), which assisted war veterans. She was first a volunteer and then became a consultant in the main pension office.

In 1924, she became a member of the Social Democratic Party of Germany, but by 1932 she was a member of the Socialist Workers' Party of Germany.

In the middle of 1933, while known as Agnes Jünemann, she joined the communist-oriented Committee for Proletarian Unity and worked to distribute Klassenkampf (Class Warfare), the illegal newspaper put out by Otto Brenner and Eduard Wald. On 11 September 1934 she was arrested for high treason and taken to the Hanover court prison for pre-trial detention. In June 1935, she was sentenced to three years in prison by the Hamm Higher Regional Court as part of the larger procedure against Otto Brenner. She served her sentence in the Ziegenhain Prison near Kassel; she did not see her son for two and a half years.

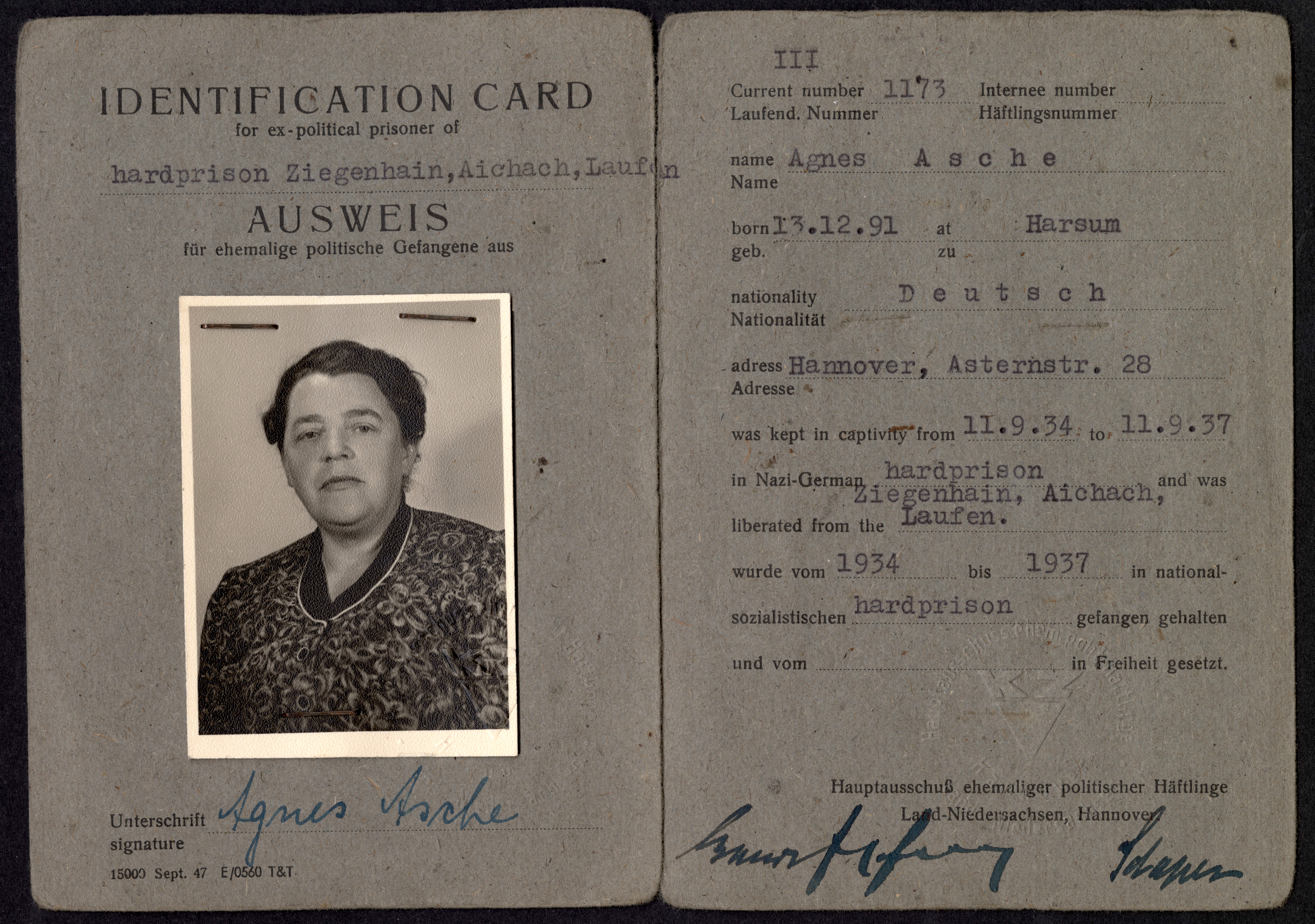
Asches "Identification Card" for ex-political prisoner ... from 1947

After her release from prison in September 1937, she worked as a machine knitter. She remained active in resistance circles until the end of World War II.

At the end of 1943, she married Otto Asche, a local to the area who worked at the Braunschweig Coal Mine; Otto Asche was elected as a socialist member to the town council of Offleben in 1946.

After World War II, she was a member of the Socialist Party of Germany, but she was expelled from the party in 1960.

== Legacy ==
A street in Ricklingen in Hanover was named in her honor in 1990.
