= Zita Zehner =

German politician (1900–1978)

Zita Zehner (November 8, 1900 in Rannungen at Schweinfurt, Germany – September 10, 1978 in Munich) was a radio host, home economist, entrepreneur, resolute anti-Nazi, and German politician.

Zehner was a native of Franconia who moved to Munich in 1927 where she hosted a Ministry of Agriculture radio broadcast on home economics themes. She was ousted by the Nazis in 1933 because of her role as an organizer of Catholic women and youth. Following her dismissal, she started selling home items door-to-door first by bicycle, then motorcycle and finally by car. In 1935, she was arrested by the Nazis who accused her of making anti-Nazi statements at a meeting of housewives to discuss cooking and household problems. After her release, her Nazi neighbors harassed and threatened to kill her forcing her to move to a distant part of Munich where she later set up a small noodle factory.

On August 8, 1945, following the German defeat, Zehner was appointed by the American Military Government to the reconstituted Munich City Council as its only woman member. She was the first woman to have any official position in the Bavarian State since the Nazis seized power.

At the first election to the Bavarian state parliament on December 1, 1946, Zehner received a mandate as a deputy. From 1953 to 1969, she was chairwoman of the State Working Women's Association of the CSU (Christian Social Union as the Christian Democratic Party is known in Bavaria), the later women's union. On 3 July 1959, she was awarded the Bavarian Order of Merit.

Zehner was quoted by the New York Times speaking about her resistance to the Nazis:

Too many Germans have argued that it wasn't possible to resist the Nazis and live. I am the best evidence that it could be done, for I never ceased to fight them and I have survived. I never jointed the party nor any organization affiliated with it, nor did any member of my family, except one nephew, who was a member of the Hitler Jugend. I am grateful that we have an opportunity to breathe free air again and look forward to a better future.
