= Ernst Hampel =

German painter and resistance fighter

Ernst Hampel (16 June 1919 – 20 April 1945) was a German painter and resistance fighter against National Socialism as well as a victim of Nazi wartime justice. He was one of the protagonists of the Etter-Rose-Hampel group, also named after him.

== Life and activity ==
Hampel was born in Hamburg on 16 June 1919, he was the youngest of three sons of the Carl Hampel and his wife Franziska. After attending school he was trained as a painter. He then went to the State School of Arts and Crafts in Hamburg am Lerchenfeld. During this time he worked, among other things, on Johann Michael Bossard's project "Gesamtkunstwerk" in Lüneburg.

During the Weimar Republic, Hampel joined the Communist Youth Association of Germany (KJVD). After the National Socialists came to power, he became involved in left-wing free youth groups, which continued to exist in non-public form parallel to the Hitler Youth.

From November 1938 to February 1939, Hampel completed the compulsory Reich Labor Service. In August 1939 he was forcibly recruited for military service. In September of the same year he became engaged to Amanda Löwe (* 1921), although she was considered to be half Jewish by National Socialist standards. The marriage was not allowed to be concluded due to the racial laws. A daughter born in 1943 resulted from the union.

After training as an artilleryman, Hampel took part in the Wehrmacht's attacks on the western neighboring states of the German Reich in 1940, was promoted to sergeant in December 1940, and from 1941 he was deployed in the war of aggression against the Soviet Union. Due to frostbite he suffered in Russia, he was sent back home in January 1942 and used as an instructor.

Politically, Hampel maintained contact with Max Kristeller, a former KPD functionary, since 1940, with whom he regularly discussed politics, especially the Nazi system and the war. Both agreed that the war had to end with a defeat for the National Socialist German Reich and the victory of the Soviet Union. Kristeller also encouraged Hampel to listen to foreign radio stations, which had been strictly prohibited since 1939. After his return from Russia in the spring of 1942, Hampel intensified his contacts with Kristeller as well as with his old crypto-communist circle of friends. Based on the conviction that in order to achieve the goal of ending the war as quickly as possible, it would be expedient to supplement the efforts of the Allied powers to defeat the Nazi military machinery with measures that would drive the collapse of the Nazi state from within, Hampel and his circle of friends decided to enter into active resistance work against the regime: In particular, it fell to Hampel to discreetly campaign among military personnel with whom he was in contact for a turn away from the Nazi regime.

After a denunciation – at a New Year's Eve celebration at the end of 1942, Hampel, Kristeller and some friends had openly spoken out against the Nazi regime in the presence of an informer and called for an early defeat in the war – the group was gradually broken up in the spring of 1943: Kristeller was arrested in May. Hampel's arrest followed on 2 June 1943 at the Rendsburg military training area. After a long period of remand in Hamburg's Fuhlsbüttel police prison and the remand prison in Hamburg-Stadt am Holstenglacis (since 29 March 1944), he was transferred to the regional court prison in Stendal on 19 May 1944. At this time, he was charged by the Volksgerichtshof (People's Court) with preparing him for treason, aiding and abetting the enemy and undermining his military service. The trial took place on 4 and 5 January 1945. In its verdict of 5 January 1945 the court found him guilty and sentenced him to death. In the grounds for the verdict, it stated, among other things, that he had "discussed the political and war situation in a defeatist and communist sense, wished for Germany's defeat and called for unity in the expected communist overthrow".

Hampel's execution was carried out in Brandenburg-Görden Prison on 20 April 1945 – the last day on which executions were carried out in this prison – with the guillotine.

Today a stumbling block (German: Stolperstein) in front of the house at Quickbornstraße 31, which was initiated by his nephew Bernd Hampel and his son Steffen Moritz, in Hamburg commemorates Ernst Hampel.

== Literature ==
- Dieter Thiele/Reinhard Saloch: Auf den Spuren der Bertinis: Ein literarischer Spaziergang durch Hamburg-Barmbek (In the Footsteps of the Bertinis: A Literary Walk through Hamburg-Barmbek), 2003, pp. 94–96. ISBN 978-3879758968

== Commemoration ==
A stolperstein in the Eimsbüttel borough of Hamburg for Hampel was created in 1996.
