= Karl Fischer (politician) =

German politician (1893–1940)

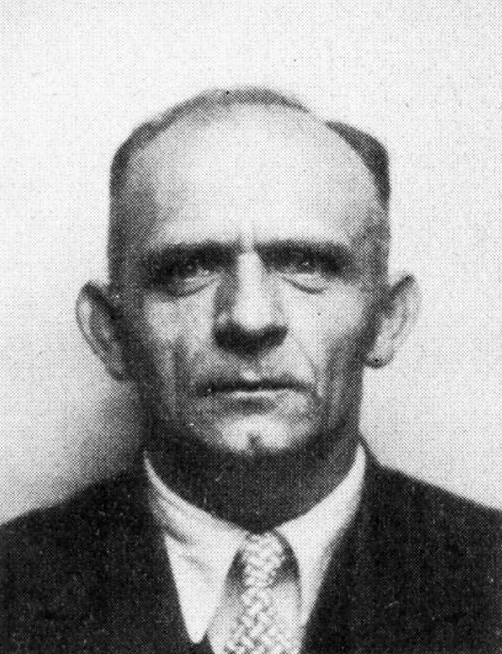
- Fischer c. 1932

Member of the Landtag of Prussia for Merseburg
- In office 25 May 1932 – 31 March 1933
- Preceded by: Multi-member district
- Succeeded by: Constituency abolished

Personal details
- Born: 19 January 1893 Reichenschwand, Kingdom of Bavaria, German Empire
- Died: 25 March 1940 (aged 47) Sachsenhausen concentration camp, Province of Brandenburg, Free State of Prussia, Nazi Germany
- Cause of death: Heart condition
- Party: SPD (1910–1921); KPD (after 1921)
- Education: International Lenin School
- Occupation: Politician; Locksmith

Military service
- Allegiance: German Empire
- Years of service: 1914–1918
- Battles/wars: World War I
- Central institution membership: 1927–1932: Candidate member, KPD Central Committee; Other offices held: 1933: Political Leader, Hesse-Kassel KPD; 1930–1932: Political Leader, Baden-Palatinate KPD; 1928–1929: Political Leader, Palatinate KPD; 1927: Organizational Leader, North Bavaria KPD

Karl Ferdinand Fischer (19 January 1893 – 25 March 1940) was a German communist politician who served in the Landtag of Prussia from 1932 to 1933. A leading functionary of the Communist Party of Germany (KPD) in southern Germany, he was dismissed from most positions in 1932 for opposing party leader Ernst Thälmann. After the Nazis came to power, Fischer was active in the resistance before and after his 1933 arrest, including in Sachsenhausen concentration camp, where he died in 1940.

== Biography ==
Fischer was born in Reichenschwand, Bavaria on 19 January 1893, the son of a laborer. In 1910, he joined the Social Democratic Party of Germany (SPD). He trained as a locksmith and subsequently worked in that profession until 1914, when he was drafted into the First World War. After the November Revolution of 1918, he worked as a locksmith in Nuremberg. Even before the revolution, Fischer had participated in wage disputes and strikes. As a result, he was repeatedly reprimanded and dismissed.

Fischer joined the Communist Party of Germany (KPD) in 1921. At the beginning of 1927, he became the Orgleiter (organizational leader) of the KPD district of North Bavaria. At the KPD Party Congress in Essen in March 1927, he was elected as a candidate to the Central Committee. In the autumn of 1927, Fischer, together with August Creutzburg, was sent to the Palatinate as a commissar to lead the ultra-left district. After Creutzburg's departure, Fischer became the Polleiter (political leader) for the Palatinate in Ludwigshafen am Rhein in April 1928. At the 12th Party Congress in Wedding in 1929, Fischer was again elected as a candidate to the Central Committee, despite opposing party leader Ernst Thälmann during the Wittorf Affair.

After briefly attending a German party school in 1927, Fischer was sent to the International Lenin School in Moscow in September 1929. Upon his return in June 1930, he became political leader of the newly-created KPD district of Baden-Palatinate in Mannheim. In April 1932, he was elected to the Prussian Landtag representing the Merseburg district. In the same month, he was removed from the Central Committee and dismissed as political leader for supporting Heinz Neumann in challenging Thälmann; Robert Klausmann succeeded him as political leader, but Fischer kept his position in the Landtag.

Following the Nazi seizure of power and the arrest of the leaders of the illegal KPD's Hesse-Kassel district in May 1933, Fischer took over the leadership and organized the resistance. He was arrested on 20 November 1933, and sentenced to three years in prison on 7 November 1934. In Luckau Prison, he led an illegal KPD training circle. After serving his sentence, he was deported to Sachsenhausen concentration camp on 14 December 1937. There, he was one of the leading organizers of the illegal resistance within the camp. Together with Bernhard Bästlein and Karl Wloch, he wrote the Sachsenhausenlied ("Sachsenhausen Song"). On 25 March 1940, Fischer died of a heart condition caused by mistreatment and harsh prison conditions.

== Sources ==
- Heinz Schumann, Gerda Werner (Hrsg.): Erkämpft das Menschenrecht. Lebensbilder und letzte Briefe antifaschistischer Widerstandskämpfer. Dietz, Berlin 1958, S. 151.
- Hermann Weber: Die Wandlung des deutschen Kommunismus. Die Stalinisierung der KPD in der Weimarer Republik. Band 2. Frankfurt am Main 1969, S. 117.
- Luise Kraushaar: Deutsche Widerstandskämpfer 1933–1945. Biographien und Briefe. Band 1. Dietz, Berlin 1970, S. 260f.
- Martin Schumacher (Hrsg.): M.d.L. Das Ende der Parlamente 1933 und die Abgeordneten der Landtage und Bürgerschaften der Weimarer Republik in der Zeit des Nationalsozialismus. Politische Verfolgung, Emigration und Ausbürgerung 1933–1945. Droste, Düsseldorf 1995, ISBN 3-77005-189-0, S. 38.
- Katja Klein: Kazett-Lyrik. Untersuchungen zu Gedichten und Liedern aus dem Konzentrationslager Sachsenhausen. Königshausen & Neumann, Würzburg 1995, ISBN 3-826-01057-4, S. 62f.
- Klaus J. Becker: Die KPD in Rheinland-Pfalz 1946–1956. von Hase & Koehler, Mainz 2001, ISBN 3-7758-1393-4, S. 435f.
