= Martin Weise =

German journalist and resistance fighter (1903–1943)

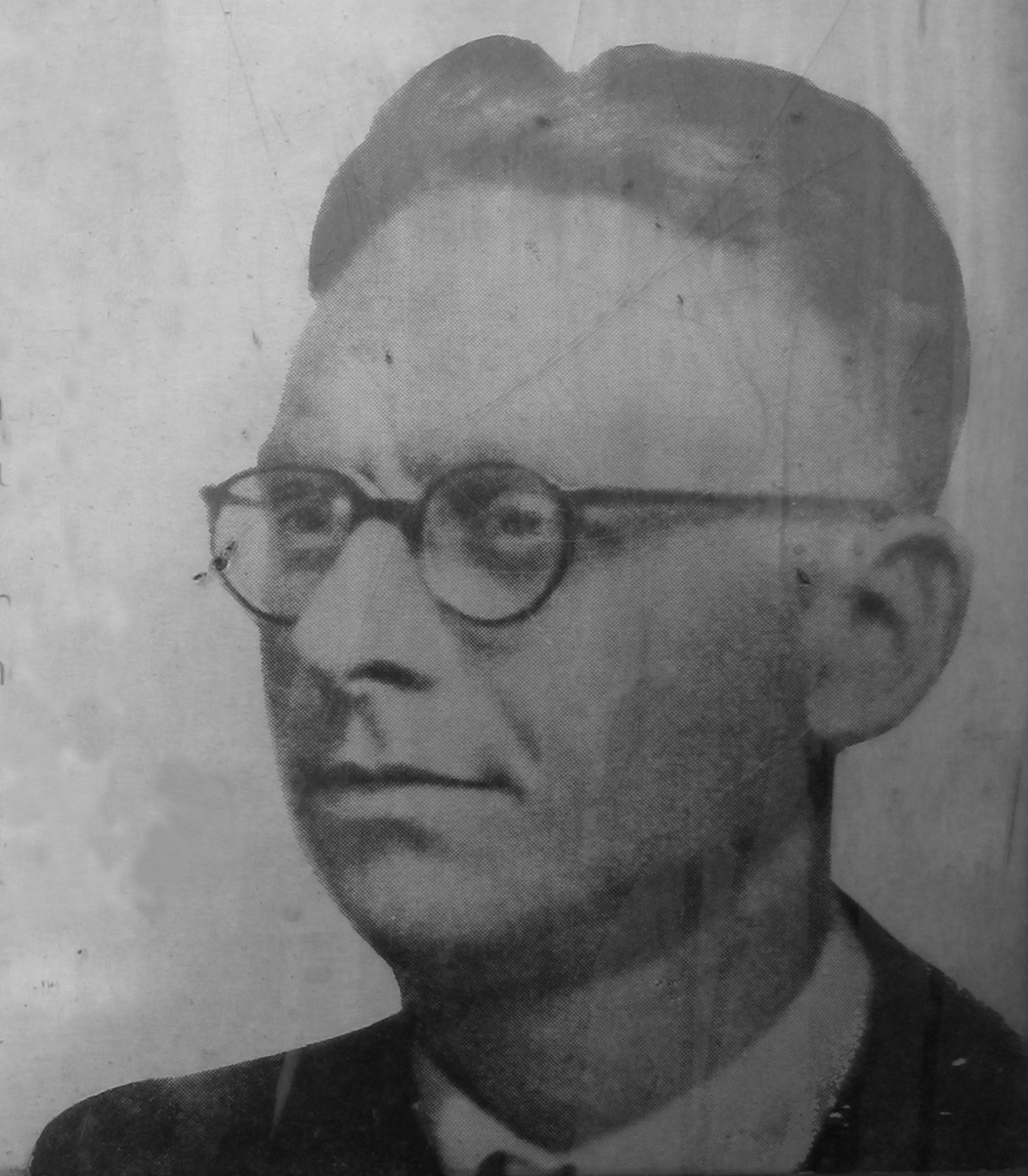
- Portrait for Martin Weise taken from a Memorial plaque at 42 Jonasstrasse Berlin
- Born: 12 May 1903; Torgau, German Empire
- Died: 15 November 1943 (aged 40); Brandenburg-Görden Prison, Nazi Germany
- Cause of death: Guillotine
- Occupation: Journalist
- Partner: Baroness Frieda von Seidlitz

Martin Weise (12 May 1903 – 15 November 1943) was a German journalist, member of the Communist Party of Germany (KPD) and a resistance fighter against the Nazis during World War II. From 1929 to 1934, Weiss published the socialist Die Rote Fahne newspaper. He was arrested and sent to a concentration camp until 1939. When he was released, he decided to resist and made contact with Wilhelm Guddorf and the Hamburg based group around Bernhard Bästlein and Robert Abshagen He became associated with an anti-fascist resistance group that was run by Harro Schulze-Boysen and Arvid Harnack, that was later called the Red Orchestra by the Abwehr.

== Life ==
Wiese was the son of a teacher. As a secondary school pupil, Weise joined the Wandervogel movement, then the Freie sozialistische Jugend (FSJ), then later still in 1927, the Communist Party of Germany (KPD), becoming a committed communist.

Weise began studying history and philosophy in 1922. However, he had to abandon his studies in 1924 for financial reasons. Before becoming unemployed in 1928, Weise worked for a few years as a clerk in an insurance company. From 1929 to 1933 he was a district councillor for the KPD in Neukölln in Bertlin. From 1930, he wrote articles for the central organ of the KPD, Die Rote Fahne. Weise was one of the editors who continued to publish this newspaper illegally after the Nazis Seizure of control in 1933.

On 5 April 1934, he was sentenced by the Berlin Court of Appeal, to three years in prison, which he spent in the Brandenburg prison. He learned that his fiancée Baroness Frieda Seidlitz, who had worked as a courier for the KPD, had committed suicide in prison on 27 May 1936, after succumbing to Gestapo abuse while in custody. After his release from prison in 1937, he was transferred to Sachsenhausen concentration camp. After his release from the concentration camp in April 1939, Weise re-established contact with his friends, including Wilhelm Guddorf. Weise and Guddorf established links with the Hamburg communists, Bernhard Bästlein and Robert Abshagen. Together they collaborated on the pamphlet "Organised the Revolutionary Mass Struggle" (Organisiert den revolutionären Massenkampf). Together with John Sieg, Fritz Lange and Walter Husemann, Weise regularly distributed the underground journal Die Innere Front (The Home Front) in Berlin from the end of 1941, which contained appeals, information about the general situation and references to the broadcast frequencies of Moscow radio.

== Death ==
Weise was arrested in December 1942. On 8 October 1943 the 2nd Senate of the People's Court condemned him to death because of "preparation for high treason and because of enemy favouritism". Weise was executed by beheading in Brandenburg prison on 15 November 1943.

== Bibliography ==
- Louise Kraushaar; Hans Dress; Institut für Marxismus-Leninismus beim Zentralkomitee der SED. (1970). Deutsche Widerstandskämpfer 1933-1945 : Biographien und Briefe [German Resistance Fighters 1933 - 1945 - Biographies and Letters] (in German). Vol. 2. Berlin: Dietz. pp. 412–415. OCLC 186649145.
- Steinbach, Peter; Tuchel, Johannes; Adam, Ursula (1998). Lexikon des Widerstandes : 1933-1945. Beck'sche Reihe, Bd. 1061. (in German) (2nd Revised, expanded ed.). München: C.H. Beck. pp. 215–216. ISBN 9783406438615. OCLC 750843417.
