= Fritz Lange (politician) =

German communist politician and resistance fighter (1898–1981)

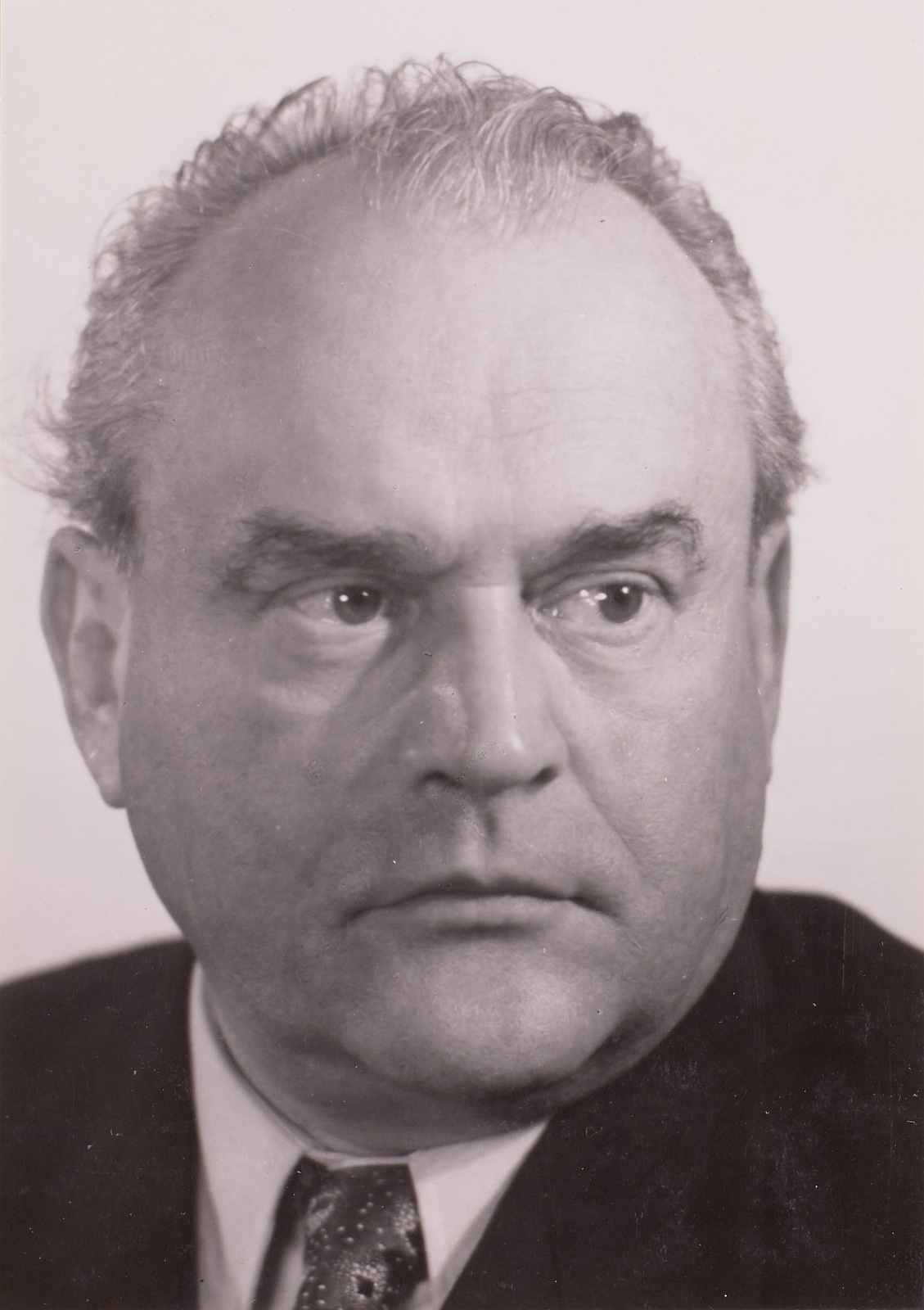
Lange in Berlin, 1956

Emil Alfred Fritz Lange (23 November 1898, Berlin – 16 September 1981) was a German communist politician and resistance fighter during the Nazi era. Later Lange was Minister for Popular Education in the German Democratic Republic (GDR).

== Biography ==
Lange attended the Siemens Oberrealschule in the Berlin suburb of Charlottenburg from 1904 to 1912 and from 1912 to 1917, the Präparandenanstalt and the teacher-training program in Neuruppin. From 1917-1918, he was a soldier in the First World War. In 1919, he passed the teacher's examination and was a volksschule teacher in the Neuköln suburb of Berlin until 1924. In 1919, he joined the Independent Social Democratic Party of Germany and in 1920, the Communist Party of Germany (KPD). From 1921-1924, he was in the national leadership of the Communist Kindergruppe. In 1924, he was let go from his job and became a leading functionary of the Rotfrontkämpferbund from 1925-1928, as well as the district representative from Neukölln and a city delegate from Berlin from 1925-1933. Lange was the editor in the agitation and propaganda department of the Central Committee of the KPD from 1927-1933 and from 1930-1932, he was in the national leadership of the Kampfbund gegen den Faschismus, an antifascist organization of the KPD devoted to the fight against fascism. In 1933, he was arrested and was sent to the Sonnenburg concentration camp. Afterwards, he lived as a worker and sales employee until 1942.

From 1935, he was active in the Resistance, working, among others, in the group that formed around Bernhard Bästlein and Wilhelm Guddorf. He was associate editor of the left-wing newspaper Die Innere Front ("The Internal Front"), which published articles for opponents of Adolf Hitler from various backgrounds, even publishing some articles in foreign languages. As a result, he is considered to have been involved in the Rote Kapelle.

On 1 December 1942, he and Martin Weise were arrested, and on 8 October 1943 he was convicted in the second Senate of the Reichskrieggericht, the highest military court during the Nazi era. His crime was "complicity in treason and aiding the enemy" and he was sentenced to five years at hard labor. He was in various prisons until 1945, including the notorious Brandenburg-Görden Prison, where thousands were executed, including over 1,780 Resistance fighters.

== After 1945 ==
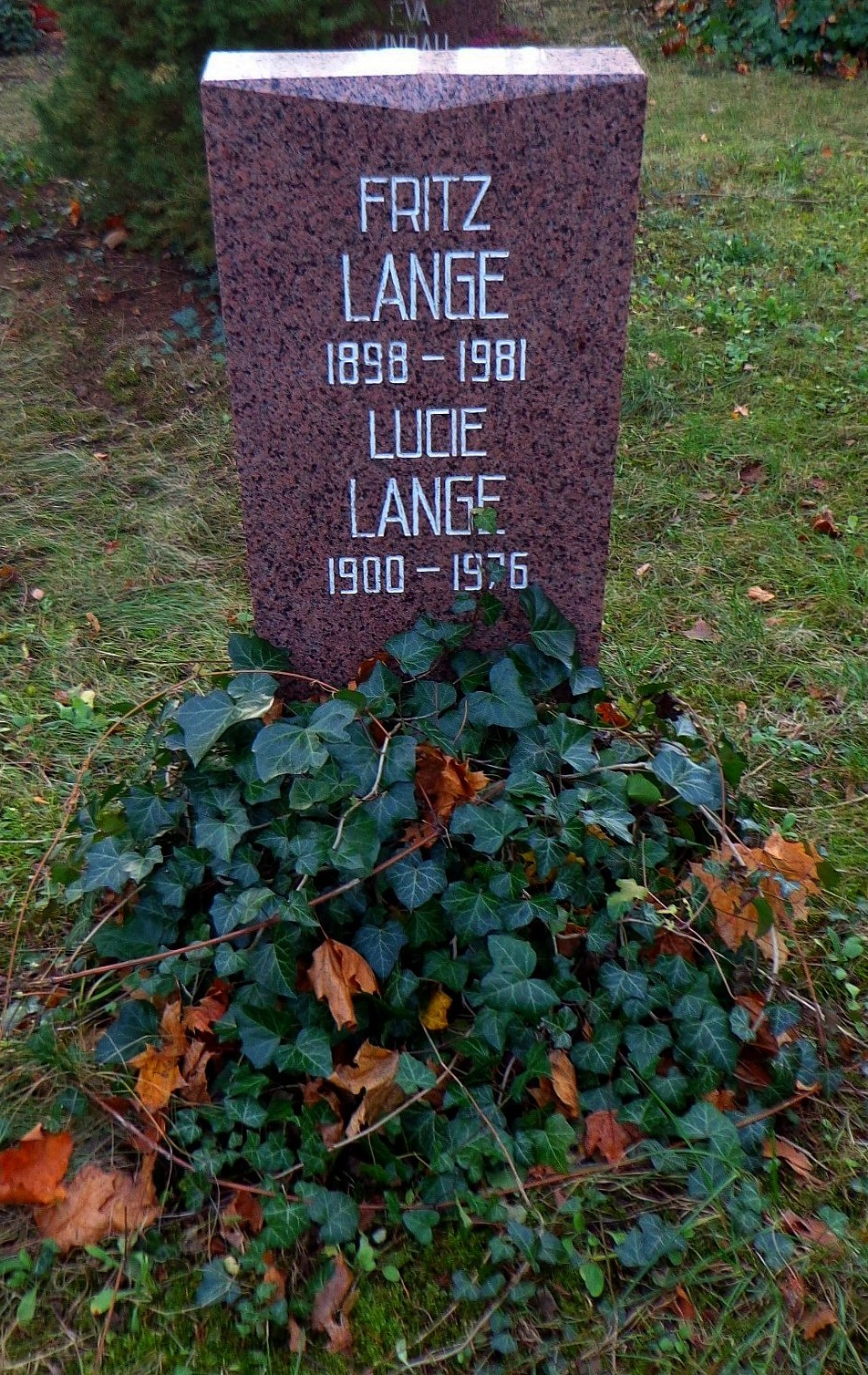
Lange's grave in Berlin

From 1945 to 1948, Lange was the mayor of Brandenburg an der Havel. Afterwards he was head of the Zentralen Kontrollkommission ("Central Control Commission") of the German Economic Commission and from 1949 to 1954, of the Zentrale Kommission für Staatliche Kontrolle, an executive organ of the Sozialistische Einheitspartei Deutschlands (SED) in the Soviet occupation zone, later the GDR.

From 1950 to 1958, he was a representative in the Volkskammer and a candidate for the Central Committee of the SED. In 1954, he became the Minister of Education. As Minister, he became part of a trend taking place in both East and West Germany that sought to reconnect with German culture, with those parts of Germany's past that was not controversial, not full of war and misery.

After criticism on the 5th Party Congress of the SED in 1958, he was removed from his position. From 1960 to 1961, he worked at the Militärgeschichtliches Institut der DDR ("Military History Institute of the GDR") in Potsdam.

Lange died in Berlin in 1981.

== Honors ==
In 1955, Lange was awarded the Vaterländischer Verdienstorden, a medal for patriotism and service to his country.

== See also ==
- Government of East Germany
- List of Germans who resisted Nazism
