= Erich Heins =

Erich Heins (born 1 November 1907 in Hamburg; died 26 June 1944 in Hamburg Remand Prison) was a German communist and resistance fighter against the Nazis who was killed by them.

== Life ==
Heins came from a Hamburg worker family. After elementary school, he learned the trade of locksmith and worked in the Blohm & Voss shipyard. He joined the Communist Party (KPD), then joined the Roter Frontkämpferbund (RFB) resistance movement, and was active against upcoming Nazism. After the NSDAP (Nazi party) took power he continued this now illegal activity. When the Gestapo became aware that the RFB met in his apartment, he was taken for three months into "protective custody".

In the early 1940s at the shipyard where he worked he connected with the Bästlein-Jacob-Abshagen Group, a resistance group concerned about foreign forced labor that had been supplied from the war in Eastern Europe. Political enlightenment about actual war events and sabotage were among their resistance activities. When they were betrayed to the Nazi authorities, Hein and several of his associates were arrested in May 1944, and sentenced to death in the "Hamburg Communist trials" of the People's Court. Erich Hein was executed by guillotine on 26 June 1944, along with Karl Kock, Hans Köpke, Ernst Mittelbach, Walter Reber, Wilhelm Stein, Paul Thürey, Kurt Vopahl and Oskar Voss.

== Links ==
- note to execution Retrieved August 24, 2011
