= Walter Bohne =

German communist and resistance fighter against Nazism

- Born: January 9, 1903; Burg bei Magdeburg, Germany
- Died: January 5, 1944 (aged 40); Hamburg, Germany
- Cause of death: Shot by Gestapo
- Occupations: Shipbuilder, resistance fighter
- Political party: Communist Party of Germany (KPD)

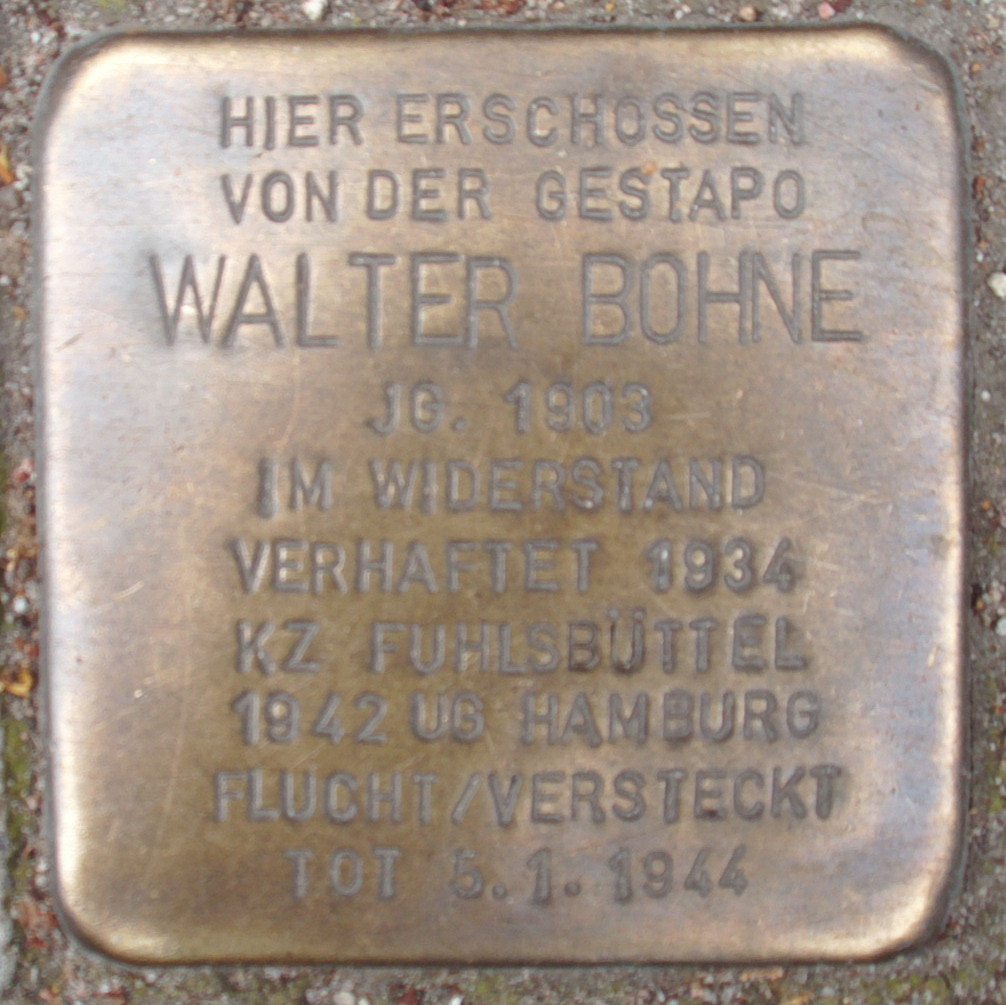
Stolperstein for Walter Bohne in Klosterstern, Harvestehude (Hamburg)

Walter Bohne (9 January 1903 – 5 January 1944) was a German communist and resistance fighter against Nazism.

== Biography ==
Bohne was born in Burg bei Magdeburg. A shipbuilder by profession, he joined the Young Communist League of Germany (KJVD) in 1921 and the Communist Party of Germany (KPD) shortly afterwards. He moved to Hamburg in 1928 and was active in the Red Sport International. In 1934 he was arrested and sentenced to two years' imprisonment.

After his release, Bohne organized a group of communist athletes from 1939 and joined the Bästlein-Jacob-Abshagen Group, an anti-Nazi resistance group, in 1941. He was arrested and imprisoned again in 1942, but managed to escape after the bombing of Hamburg in July 1943. On 5 January 1944, three Gestapo officers tried to arrest Bohne in Hamburg; when trying to defend himself, he was shot to death.
