= Robert Abshagen =

German resistance member

Robert Abshagen

Robert Abshagen (12 January 1911 – 10 July 1944) was a German Resistance fighter against National Socialism and a Communist.

== Biography ==
Abshagen was born in Hamburg. He first worked in insurance, then as a sailor and finally, as a construction worker. He joined the Communist Party of Germany in 1931.

Beginning in 1933, he took part in the illegal German Resistance in Hamburg against Nazism. In 1934, he was sentenced in Hamburg state supreme court of "Vorbereitung zum Hochverrat" (intent to commit treason) to two and a half years at hard labor in a Zuchthaus, which he spent in Bremen-Oslebshausen Prison in Gröpelingen.

After serving his sentence, he was sent to Sachsenhausen concentration camp. While at Sachsenhausen, Absagen and other prisoners, including Bernhard Bästlein, held cultural and literary gatherings. As the Nazis began to deport more Jews after Kristallnacht, they also plundered their books and stockpiled them in concentration camps. In 1936-1937, the Sachsenhausen library had 500 books and two years later, 800 books. Beginning in 1936, Bästlein and Volker Paddry recited poetry and prose they had learned by heart and Abshagen held programs on proletarian and progressive writings. These programs strengthened the spirit of those who attended, who then lifted the spirit of those who hadn't and thus, the prisoners remained unbroken by their circumstances.

Abshagen was released in April 1939 and returned to Hamburg, where he again got involved in the Communist Party Resistance movement in Hamburg, in the waterfront district. In 1940, he got in touch with Bernhard Bästlein and Franz Jacob, who were also recently released from prison. Their group later became known as the Bästlein-Jacob-Abshagen Group.

Abshagen took charge of various workplace cells and maintained contact with the Resistance in other parts of Germany. In this capacity, Abshagen traveled to Berlin, Saxony and Thuringia and made contact with anti-fascists in the Ruhr area.

The special Rote Kapelle commission led to a wave of arrests by the Gestapo in autumn of 1942. The commission's findings related to the activities of Erna Eifler and Wilhelm Fellendorf swept up Abshagen on 19 October 1942. He was sentenced to death by the Volksgerichtshof (People's Court) on 2 May 1944 and was beheaded in Hamburg on 10 July 1944. His urn was buried in 1946 at the Ohlsdorf Cemetery in Hamburg, at the memorial for the executed Resistance fighters from Hamburg. There is a stolperstein for Abshagen at Wachtelstraße 4 in the Barmbek-Nord suburb of Hamburg.

== See also ==
- List of Germans who resisted Nazism

== Sources ==
- Ursula Puls: Die Bästlein-Jacob-Abshagen-Gruppe. Bericht über die antifaschistischen Widerstandskampf in Hamburg und an der Wasserkante während des 2. Weltkrieges. Dietz, Berlin (1959) (in German)}
- Luise Kraushaar (Hg.): Deutsche Widerstandskämpfer 1933–1945. Biographien und Briefe. Band 1. Dietz, Berlin 1970, pp. 35–39 (in German)
- Erkämpft das Menschenrecht. Lebensbilder und letzte Briefe antifaschistischer Widerstandskämpfer. Neuer-Weg-Verlag, Essen (1992) pp. 16–19 (in German)
