= Bernhard Bästlein =

German politician (1894–1944)

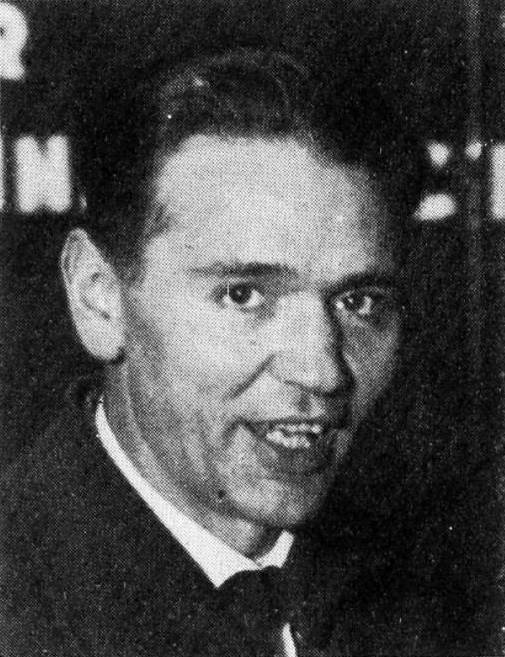
- Bästlein c. 1932

Member of the Reichstag for Cologne–Aachen
- In office Not seated
- Preceded by: Multi-member district
- Succeeded by: Constituency abolished

Member of the Landtag of Prussia for Cologne–Aachen
- In office 25 May 1932 – 31 March 1933
- Preceded by: Multi-member district
- Succeeded by: Constituency abolished

Personal details
- Born: 3 December 1894 Hamburg, German Empire
- Died: 18 September 1944 (aged 49) Brandenburg-Görden Prison, Brandenburg an der Havel, Nazi Germany
- Party: SPD (before 1917); USPD (1917–1921); KPD (after 1921)

Military service
- Allegiance: German Empire
- Branch/service: Imperial German Army
- Battles/wars: World War I
- Other offices held: 1931–1933: Political Leader, Middle Rhine KPD; 1921–1933: Member, Hamburg Parliament

Bernhard Bästlein (German: [ˈbɛʁnhaʁt ˈbɛstlaɪn]; 3 December 1894 – 18 September 1944) was a German Communist and resistance fighter against the Nazi régime. He was imprisoned very shortly after the Nazis seized power in 1933 and was imprisoned almost without interruption until his execution in 1944, by the Nazis. Nonetheless, he was one of the most important leaders of German Resistance.

== Early years ==
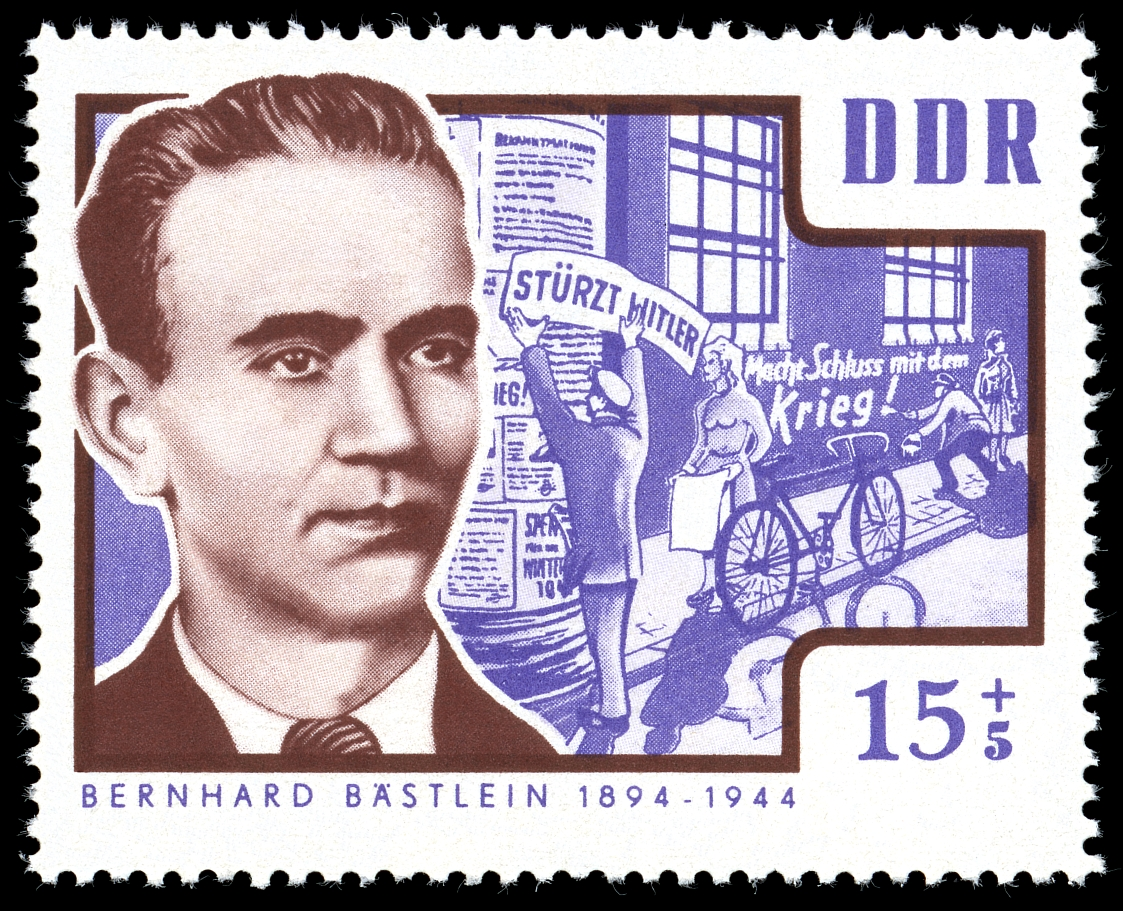
Bernhard Bästlein, 1964 stamp from the GDR

Bernhard Karl Bästlein was born the fourth of five children to Bernhard Bästlein Sr. of Thuringia and Cornelia Bästlein, née Kock, of East Friesland. His father came from a family of toymakers and gunsmiths and worked as a gunsmith and safe builder. He was a member of the Social Democratic Party of Germany (SPD) and an avid trade union member. After grammar school, Bästlein was trained as a precision mechanic. At the same time, he took evening classes at a worker's education school and the Volkshochschule.

In 1911, Bästlein finished his training as a mechanic and joined the Socialist Workers Youth Party (Sozialistischen Arbeiterjugend), where he met his future wife, the seamstress Johanna Elisabeth Hermine Berta Zenk, daughter of Wilhelmine (née Schröder) and Albert Zenk, a working-class family and Social Democrats.

The following year, Bästlein joined the metal workers' union and the SPD and from 1913 till 1915, he went to work at different armaments factories, at which point he became a soldier and went to fight in France on the western front in 1916. In 1917, he began to write articles about the revolutionary developments then taking place in Russia. Writing under the pen name, "Berne Bums", he took a position of peace through revolution. On returning to civilian life, he was elected to a council of workers and soldiers in November 1918 and he began writing as the "worker correspondent" for the Hamburg Peoples' Press, a volunteer position. He also switched his party affiliation to the Independent Social Democratic Party of Germany (USPD) because of the SPD's stance on war bonds to help pay for World War I.

== Switch to the Communist Party ==
As the left wing of the USPD merged with the Communist Party of Germany (KPD), Bästlein and his wife joined the KPD. In March 1921, Bästlein was elected to the Hamburgische Bürgerschaft, the legislature of Hamburg. At that time, decisions urged by the Communist International, caused the KPD to incite unrest in Saxony and the Ruhr region. A general strike was called in Hamburg on 21 March 1921 and Bästlein went to the demonstration on the wharfs against Blohm + Voss. There were fights with the police and after the demonstration, Bästlein found himself wanted by the police on charges of "conspiracy to commit high treason.

Bästlein fled to Petrograd (now St. Petersburg) and worked as an editor, lecturer and teacher at the KPD school in Moscow, where his wife joined him. The two were able to take part in the IV World Congress of the Communist International in December 1922. An amnesty in Germany led to the couple's return in January 1923. Their first child was born in 1924 but died shortly after birth.

From 1923 to 1930, Bästlein worked as an editor at several KPD newspapers in Dortmund, Hagen, Wuppertal, Remscheid and Solingen. He was forced to appear in court several times for "press offenses" and once on a charge of high treason, but having learned in the interim about law regarding political offenses, he chose to defend himself, which he did successfully. In 1929, he was editor-in-chief of the Bergische Arbeiterstimme in Solingen and he became the KPD deputy district leader in Düsseldorf. In 1930, he became the district leader in Cologne. In 1930, Bästlein received only a small stipend, so small that he and his wife had to sublet from members of the party. The following year, in February 1931, Bästlein became the Political Leader of the Middle Rhine district of the KPD and for the first time received enough salary to live on. In April 1932, Bästlein was elected to the Landtag of Prussia and his second child was born, a son.

== After 1933 ==
Bernhard Bästlein was elected to the Reichstag on 5 March 1933, but this was the election that brought the Nazis to greater power in the government and he was never able to fulfill his duties.

After Hitler had consolidated power, the Nazis began to round up their opponents. Bästlein was arrested in May and charged with "conspiracy to commit high treason". He was sentenced at the Volksgerichtshof to 20 months at hard labor in a Zuchthaus and was sent to Siegburg Prison. Upon release, on 12 February 1935, he returned to his family in Hamburg.

On 8 March 1935 he was placed in preventive detention, indicted as the "intellectual author" of a murder in Bonn. Despite the fact that the case was closed, Bästlein was sent to the concentration camp in Esterwegen and in 1936, to Sachsenhausen, where he met Robert Abshagen, Franz Jacob, Julius Leber, Harry Naujoks, Wilhelm Guddorf and Martin Weise. While at Sachsenhausen, Bästlein wrote the Sachsenhausenlied ("Sachsenhausen Song") alongside Karl Fischer and Karl Wloch, which was at the demand of the SS guards, who would use music to torment and mock the prisoners, making them sing while involved in hard labor or when they were exhausted. The prisoners, however, used the singing as an opportunity to uplift their spirits and encourage prisoner unity and an anti-fascist spirit. In April 1939, he was sent to the Cologne prison, Klingelpütz, where he stayed in police custody till 6 April 1940. Returning to his family, then living at Goldbekufer 19 in Hamburg, he worked as a car washer and driver, then later in Altona, at Riepe-Werken, making ballpoint pens.

== Hamburg activity and another arrest ==
Bästlein began getting together with friends from Sachsenhausen, such as Abshagen, Jacob and Oskar Reincke, who all wanted to get back to work in the German Resistance. In 1941, they built the Bästlein-Jacob-Abshagen Group, with the objective of educating workers and organizing acts of sabotage. They were active in the Hamburg shipyards, developing over 30 factory cells and supporting prisoners of war and forced laborers. In time, they built a network of contacts in northern Germany, in Flensburg, Kiel, Lübeck, Rostock and Bremen and even with groups outside of Germany. These connections were each overseen by a single leader to lessen the chances of the whole network being exposed to the Nazi authorities.

In the middle of 1942, there was a major leaflet campaign directed at construction workers, primarily in Hamburg, who were forced to work with the Organisation Todt in Norway and the Soviet Union. The leaflets linked the general socio-political demands for wages and severance pay with the call to commit acts of sabotage. It closed with the slogan, "Hitler's defeat is not our defeat, but our victory!"

In mid-May 1942, four people entered Germany illegally by parachute, jumping from Soviet planes over East Prussia. Two of them, Erna Eifler and Wilhelm Fellendorf, made their way to Hamburg to Fellendorf's mother. At the beginning of July, they contacted the Bastlein-Jacob-Abshagen Group, looking for a safe house. Unfortunately, the Gestapo was on their trail. On 15 October 1942 the Gestapo began a wave of arrests and two days later, they arrested Bästlein at work. He was shot in the leg, trying to escape. He was taken to the KolaFu in Hamburg and tortured severely, after which, he tried to commit suicide by throwing himself down a stairwell, but survived.

On 30 November 1942, he gave the Gestapo a written statement explaining why he had been and would remain a Resistance fighter.

The first factor was my seven-year confinement from 1933 to 1940 – four years of which were in concentration camps – during which I experienced, saw and heard abominable things. This period removed any shadow of a doubt regarding my political views and made rock solid my conviction, that a society, in which such things as I had experienced are possible, must be eliminated. The second factor was the 1939 beginning of the Second World War. —Bernhard Bästlein (30 November 1942 in a written statement to the Gestapo, while under their interrogation)

The war that began in 1939 had "awoken all memories of the 1914-1918 war and strengthened his conviction that as long as the capitalist social order existed, there would, again and again, be wars which would destroy all feeling in human society and likewise result in tremendous loss of material wealth."

== Escape, Berlin activity and final arrest ==
In August 1943, Bästlein was moved to Plötzensee Prison in Berlin to serve as a witness in the trial of Martin Weise, but in January 1944, the prison was bombed during an air raid and Bästlein was able to escape. He was hidden by Communists in Berlin and was also able to send a letter to his wife, informing her of his escape. By chance, he ran into Jacob in the S-Bahn and immediately began working with Jacob and Saefkow to form the leadership team of three of the Saefkow-Jacob-Bästlein Organization.

He helped create an illegal network of the Free Germany Movement (Bewegung Freies Deutschland) in Berlin-Brandenburg. But on 30 May 1944 he was once again arrested. He was brought to the Reichssicherheitshauptamt on Prinz-Albrecht-Straße and tortured for days. In July, he was sent back to Sachsenhausen.

He was sentenced to death on 5 September 1944 for the crimes of conspiracy to commit high treason, aiding the enemy and undermining military strength. The sentencing document states, "You are unteachable and unreformable." Bästlein was executed on 18 September 1944 at Brandenburg-Görden Prison.

== Family ==
Bästlein's wife also suffered hardships. After the Nazis came to power in 1933, she and their son had to vacate their home of two years. She put their belongings in storage and never saw those items again. She and son moved to Hamburg, where she lived from social welfare, but it was cut off in 1938. Thereafter, she earned a living as a seamstress. In 1943, Hamburg was the target of severe bombing and they lost their home in July. After that, they lived in a primitive arbor. She was arrested twice but was released due to lack of evidence. She remained ignorant of her husband's execution until 30 September 1944.

== Memorials ==
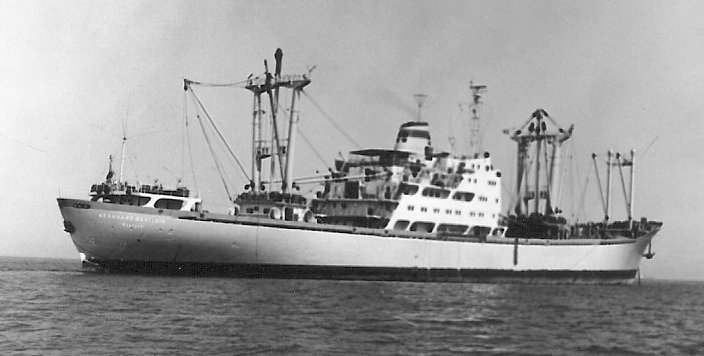
The Bernhard Bästlein in the Persian Gulf, 1976

In 1964, the GDR released stamps honoring Bästlein, Saefkow and Jacob on the occasion of the 20th anniversary of their execution by the Nazis. (See illustration, above.) Today, Berlin has a street and Hoyerswerda, Saxony has a school named for Bästlein. There is also a street named for him in Rostock. There is a stolperstein for Bastlein in the north of Hamburg, at Goldbekufer 19, where Bästlein once lived. There was a freight ship built in Rostock in 1965 that was named for Bästlein (see photo). The ship was sold to Chinese breakers in 1986 and the name was shortened to "Bernhard".

== See also ==
- List of Germans who resisted Nazism
