= Marie Priess =

German anti-fascist resistance fighter

- Born: 1885; Bünsdorf, German Empire
- Died: 9 January 1983 (aged 97–98); Reinbek, West Germany
- Children: 4

Marie Priess (née Marie Drew or Drews) (1885, Bünsdorf, Germany – 9 January 1983, Reinbek, West Germany), was an anti-fascist member of the Resistance movement during World War II and a member of the Red Orchestra organization, an espionage group in Germany.

== Biography ==
Marie Drew grew up in a working-class family in Hamburg, Germany. She belonged to the Social Democratic Party (SPD) and was a staunch opponent of the First World War led by the German Empire. During the Kiel sailors' uprising in 1918, the then 19-year-old was the only woman to belong to the workers' and soldiers' council in Kiel. During the years of the Weimar Republic (1918–1933) she joined the Communist Party of Germany (KPD) and became active against the emerging movement National Socialism and later called Nazism.

After the transfer of power to the NSDAP, Marie Priess, as she was then known, continued her resistance to the Nazi regime illegally. With the start of World War II, she belonged to the Bästlein-Jacob-Abshagen resistance group, which supported foreign forced laborers and provided shelter for persecuted people. Together with her two sons Heinz and Viktor Priess and the teacher Ernst Mittelbach, she helped the German communists Erna Eifler and husband Wilhelm Fellendorf, who had parachuted into East Prussia in the summer of 1942. Marie and Heinz offered them a hiding place in Hamburg for some time. When the Gestapo became aware of this, Marie, Heinz and Eifler were arrested in October 1942.

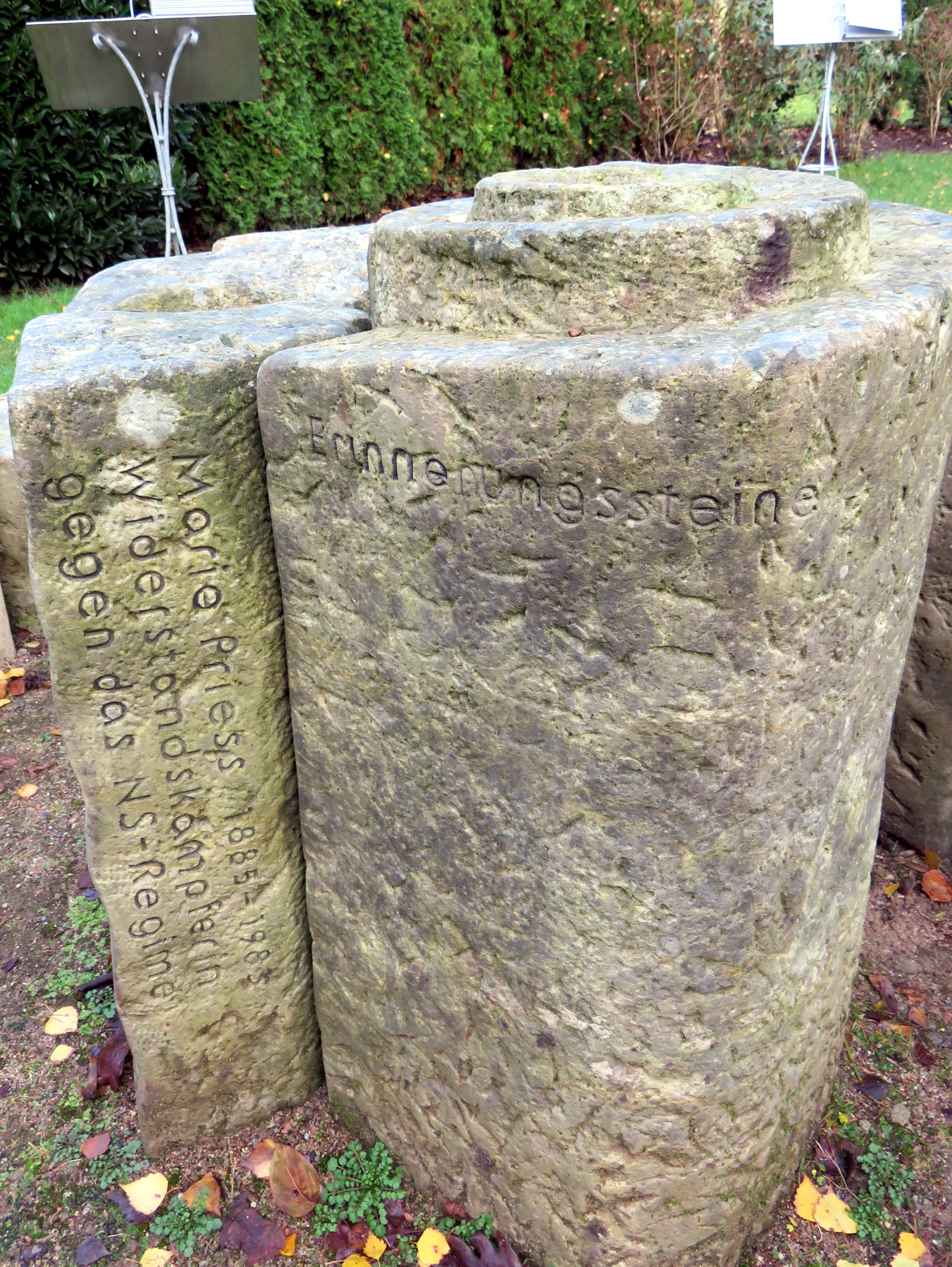
Memorial stone for Marie Priess in the spiral of remembrance in the area of the Garden of Women at the Ohlsdorf Cemetery.

Allied air raids on Hamburg at the end of July/beginning of August 1943 damaged the court's prison so badly that several hundred prisoners were given furlough with the condition that they report back after two months. Marie and Heinz Priess were furloughed and decided to go underground and live illegally in Hamburg. But they were arrested again on 19 June 1944 and both were sentenced to death by the People's Court in October 1944. Heinz Priess was deported to the Brandenburg penitentiary and executed there on 12 March 1945.

Marie Priess escaped execution because at the end of the war the Nazis suffered transportation chaos, which prevented Marie's travel to an execution site, so she survived. In an interview with Gerda Zorn, Priess said: "Why I survived - I don't know. I was transferred so many times until I was liberated by our enemies, who were, after all, our friends - our liberators. What a day!"

Marie Priess died in 1983. A memorial stone in her honor stands in the Women's Garden at Ohlsdorf Cemetery, Hamburg.

== Personal life ==
In 1908, Marie Priess married a barman from the port of Hamburg. As a soldier fighting in the First World War, he suffered combat gas poisoning, from which he never recovered. Around 1938, he died from its effects.

The couple had three sons and a daughter. The sons were Viktor (1908–1999), Bruno (1911–1938) and Heinz (1920–1945). Their daughter died of an infection at the age of nine.

== External sources ==
- Gerda Zorn: Red grandmothers, yesterday and today. Cologne 1989, p. 69ff.
