= Leo Drabent =

German peace campaigner and Communist activist (1899–1944)

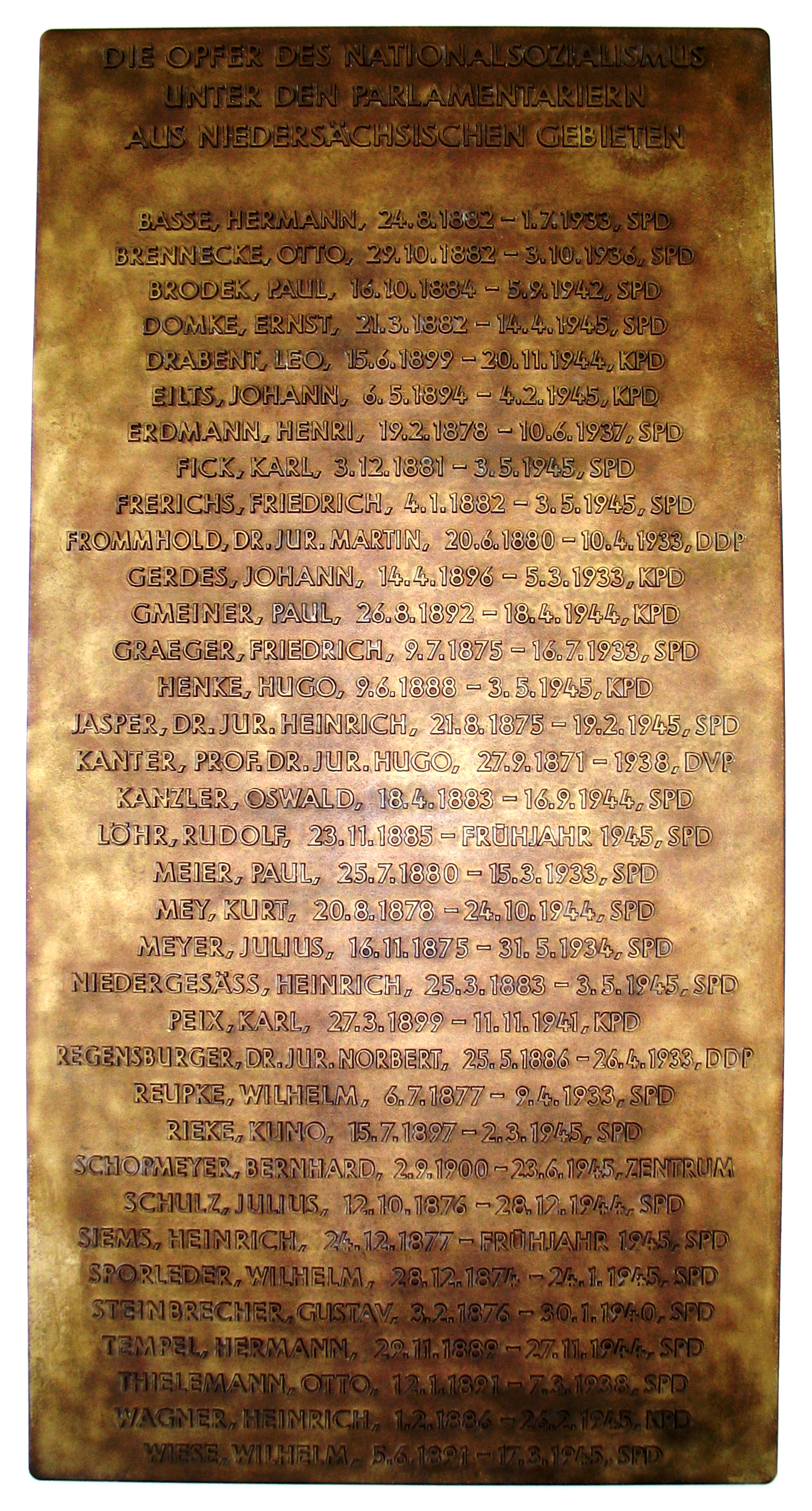
- Memorial in the Landtag of Lower Saxony to parliamentarians from the Lower Saxony region who were victims of National Socialism
- Born: 15 June 1899; Blumenthal (Bremen), Germany
- Died: 29 November 1944 (aged 45); Brandenburg an der Havel, Germany
- Occupation: Politician
- Political party: KPD
- Spouse: Marianne

Leo Drabent (15 June 1899 – 20 November 1944) was a German peace campaigner and Communist activist.

He was beheaded at the Brandenburg-Görden Prison after campaigning against the war, which ended in defeat for Germany some six months later.

== Life ==
As early as 1917 Leo Drabent was painting anti-war slogans on walls and fences in his hometown. 1917 as also the year in which he completed his traineeship as a fitter and, on reaching his eighteenth birthday, was drafted into the army. He was sent to the front, almost immediately badly wounded, and sent home. By this time he had also been part of a successful campaign to reduce from five to four years the training period for industrial apprenticeships in parts the metal based industrial sector. He joined the Communist Party in 1923 and later became the party's policy head for the Bremen sub-district. In 1929 he undertook a training at the "Rosa Luxembourg National Party School" („Reichsparteischule Rosa Luxemburg“) at Fichtenau, after which he took an responsibility for Marxist training ("...für die marxistischen Schulungen") in the Communist Party's North West region. Also in 1929 he became Party Agitation and Propaganda Secretary for the Wasserkante district and a member of the Hannover provincial legislative assembly ("...des Hannoverschen Provinziallandtages").

In January 1933 the NSDAP (Nazi Party) took power. A priority for the new government was the rapid establishment in Germany of one- party government, and the new Chancellor had, in opposition, been particularly vitriolic about the Communist Party. Leo Drabent had incurred the wrath of many Nazis during their time in opposition by attending Nazi Party meetings and speaking out against their anti-worker policies. It was reported that 200 members of the Nazi Party quasi-military wing were mandated to find and arrest Leo Drabent. The arrest took place in May 1933. He spent the next few months in concentration camps at Brandenburg and Oranienburg, and also at the latter's sub-camp at Gut Elisenau (near Bernau) where he was tortured and badly mistreated. On his release he went to work at the AG Weser shipyard in Bremen. He was rearrested in July 1936 and after a lengthy period of pre-detention sentenced, in November 1937, to three years in prison. The pretrial detention counted towards his prison term and he was released in July or August 1939.

On his release he worked in a Bremen boat repair yard and resumed his (since 1933 illegal) work for the Communist Party. As war returned, he established a resistance network together with Hans Neumann and Gustav Böhrnsen later became a mayor of Bremen, of three and five person groups, and connected with the Hamburg based Bästlein-Jacob-Abshagen Group. On 29 March 1943 Hans Neumann, Leo Drabant, his wife along with eight other resistance members were arrested by the Gestapo. On 13 October 1944 the special People's Court sentenced them all to death because they had "attempted to destroy the resistance of the German people with Communist Propaganda" ( „die Widerstandskraft des deutschen Volkes durch kommunistische Propaganda zu zersetzen gesucht“). Drabent and Neumann were guillotined at the Brandenburg-Görden Prison on 20 November 1944.

== Honours ==
- On 4 May 2005 a Stolperstein (memorial stone) was set into the ground in front of his final home at Willmannsberg 26 in Bremen.
