= Erwin Panndorf =

German parachutist and resistance fighter

- Panndorf
- Born: 7 January 1904; Gera, Thuringia, German Empire
- Died: 10 December 1942 (aged 38); Sachsenhausen concentration camp, Brandenburg, Nazi Germany
- Cause of death: Execution by firing squad
- Citizenship: Soviet
- Education: Communist University of the National Minorities of the West, International Lenin School
- Occupations: Locksmith, Soviet agent
- Employer: GRU
- Political party: Communist Party of the Soviet Union

Erwin Panndorf (7 January 1904 in Gera, 10 December 1942 in Sachsenhausen concentration camp) was a German communist, trade unionist and anti-fascist resistance fighter who became a Soviet GRU intelligence agent. In Gera, he was an active member of the Young Communist League of Germany (KJVD) and the Communist Party of Germany (KPD). As a trained locksmith, he moved to the Soviet Union in 1930 to find work. From 1937 to 1939, he fought as an Interbrigadist during the Spanish Civil War. When he returned Panndorf was recruited by the 5th Department of Red Army intelligence and trained as a spy. In May 1942, Panndorf along with Willi Börner parachuted into East Prussia in a veritable suicide mission, to conduct spying operations In July 1942, he was arrested by the Gestapo and on 10 December 1942 he was shot in Sachsenhausen concentration camp.

== Life ==
Erwin Panndorf was one of five children born to a working-class family. He grew up in the working-class suburb of Zwötzen. From 1910 to 1918, Panndorf attended the eight-form primary school. Starting in 1918, he completed an apprenticeship as a machine fitter at the Sonntag company, a medium-sized mechanical engineering firm in Gera. During his apprenticeship, he joined the German Metal Workers' Union.

After completing his apprenticeship in 1921, Panndorf worked as a locksmith in various mechanical engineering companies. In 1924, he started working as a machine fitter at the Rudolf Jahr company in Gera, which was important for him. There he was in direct contact with members of the KPD;Soviet workers and communists who dealt with export orders that the Jahr company was sending to the Soviet Union. As a result of the world economic crisis in autumn 1929, which led to deindustrialisation in Gera, Panndorf became unemployed.

== Career ==
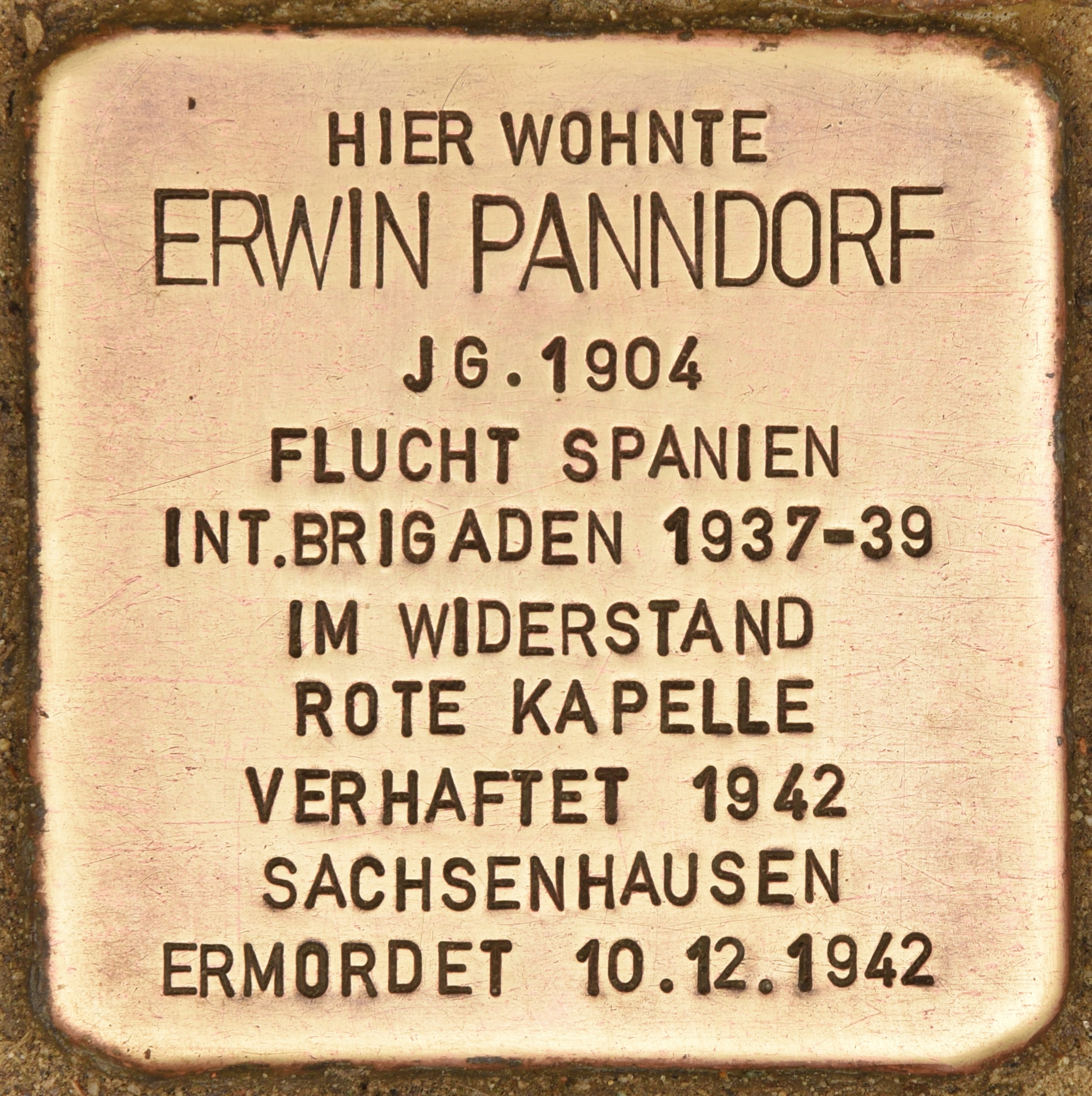
A Stolperstein to honour Panndorf, located in 4 Pfarrstraße in Gera

Due to the proletarian environment in Zwötzen, the Gera labour movement significantly influenced and played an important role for Panndorf from an early age. As a young person who was politically active, he took part in anti-war demonstrations during the World War I and in the food riots that also broke out in Gera. On 15 March 1920, Panndorf was involved in the suppression of the Kapp Putsch in Gera.

In 1920, Panndorf joined the Communist Youth League (KJD, from 1925 renamed KJVD) and the Communist Party of Germany (KPD). The Youth League became Panndorf's main political field of activity in the early 1920s. He was involved in the association's internal educational work, political agitation in the countryside, the supervision of workers' children's groups (within the framework of the "Reichsarbeitsgemeinschaft der Kinderfreunde") and in the hiking and sports movement. He was also involved in recruiting members and taking part in spectacular actions of the youth association, such as the preparations for the annual May Day celebrations. In April 1924, for example, Panndorf and his comrades hoisted red flags on a 20-metre-high electric high-voltage pylons in the immediate vicinity of the police station, and on the night before 1 May 1924, a group of the KJD under his leadership painted over the Kaiser Wilhelm equestrian monument in Gera with red varnish, which was meant to represent a protest against militarism and the state authorities. According to contemporary witnesses, these actions became known beyond Thuringia.

In September 1922, Panndorf emigrated to southern Germany in order to get in touch with other working-class youth groups. In Munich, as an amateur player, he was part of an agitation group that supported the work of the KPD. Several performances by the group were banned by the police. At the end of 1922, Panndorf returned to Gera and resumed political work there. He took an active part in the general strike to overthrow the Cuno government and mobilized apprentices from the advanced training school in Gera. After the KPD and all of its affiliated organizations were banned on 23 November 1923, the local KJD group in Zwötzen, led by Panndorf, continued its work illegally until the ban was lifted on 1 March 1924.

In 1924, Panndorf joined the Red Young Storm and later the Red Front Fighters' League (RFB). As a member of the latter, he took over the protection of communist events and he took part in RFB demonstrations. In addition, Panndorf became active in the workers' sports and hiking movement in the mid-1920s. As a workers' athlete who focused on athletics, handball and gymnastics, he led the way as a flag bearer at the 1926 sports festival of the Arbeiter-Turn- und Sportbund (ATSB), which he joined in 1928, in Elsterberg.

In the course of time, Panndorf also devoted himself increasingly to party work. He increasingly appeared as a speaker at KPD and KJVD meetings throughout Thuringia. He also regularly took part in Reich youth meetings of the KJVD, for example in Hamburg in 1927 and in Leipzig in 1930. In Gera, he also became a member of the unemployed council. Panndorf had extensive political experience by the end of the 1920s and he was quite well known in the Gera workers' movement.

== Working in the Soviet Union ==
The further course of Panndorf's life, who had been unemployed since the beginning of 1930, changed decisively in the first half of 1930. The decisive factors were his personal contacts with Soviet workers and the developments in the Soviet Union at the time, which had been striving for an enormous industrialisation push since 1929 within the framework of the First five-year plan. Qualified specialists like Panndorf were needed in the construction of the 1,500 new large-scale enterprises to be built in the Soviet Union. The KPD called for skilled workers, engineers and technicians to be delegated to the Soviet Union.

After discussions with a Soviet acceptance engineer in Gera and thanks to the mediation of the Soviet trade representation in Berlin, Panndorf received a two-year work contract as a locksmith at the Second State Clock Factory in Moscow. Together with 40 other German specialists, he started work as a mechanic in August 1930. A publicity photo in the globally circulated Arbeiter-Illustrierte-Zeitung newspaper showed him and Walter Vosseler, a German comrade and colleague of Panndorf's in Moscow, working on a lathe. According to Vossler, Panndorf quickly made contact with the Soviet workers in the factory and was held in high esteem because of his technical knowledge and social activities. This led to him being elected by the workers at the factory in January 1931 as a deputy to the Soviet of the Moscow district of Presnensky District, in which the factory was located.

In August 1931, Panndorf finally moved to the First Moscow State Clock Factory, where he worked as a machinist and fitter. At the factory he met Maria Ivanovna, then a consomlol, whom he eventually married and with whom he had their daughter Ilsa. At the beginning of 1935, Panndorf's career took him to the then largest machine tool factory in Moscow, the "Ordzhonikidze", where he worked as a foreman in a machine shop department. He received awards and benefits for his work at the factory. On 31 December 1931, for example, he was awarded the honorary title of "Activist of the 3rd Year of the Five-Year Plan as a Builder of Socialism". In addition to his work at the factory, Panndorf continued to be politically active. Thus he was an elected deputy in the City District Soviet in Moscow. In the spring of 1934, he served as an instructor on the Moscow regional radio committee. He also attended the Communist University of the National Minorities of the West for two years. He was then admitted to the Communist Party of the Soviet Union (CPSU) in 1934.

== Interbrigadist in Spain ==
After the outbreak of the civil war in Spain on 17 July 1936, Panndorf answered the call for solidarity from the executive committee of the Communist International (Comintern) and joined the International Brigades. He completed eight weeks of military training at a special school of the military academy in Ryazan with about 140 other German volunteers. He was promoted to the rank of lieutenant after his training. He also held the rank of lieutenant in Spain. On 30 May 1937 he arrived at the main Interbrigadist base in Albacete. He was assigned as commander to an eight-man tank repair platoon in the Interbrigade's tank unit. In addition to normal repairs, the tank repair platoon had to cannibalise broken-down tanks to obtain spare parts and rebuild captured tanks.

Panndorf experienced his first military confrontation at the Battle of Brunete in July 1937. He was also deployed with his mobile repair platoon at the Battle of Belchite, which was heavily contested, at the Battle of Teruel and on the Aragon Front. By 1938, Panndorf had spent eight months in wartime action at the front.

With the withdrawal of the Interbrigades to France in October 1938, Panndorf was sent to a demobilisation camp, where he remained until January 1939. When the first newly formed international battalions went to the front in Barcelona at the end of January 1939, Panndorf volunteered again. He went to the front with the first squad, where he was incorporated into the 1st Battalion of the 11th Brigade as a rifle commander. After the final defeat of the Spanish Republic in spring 1939, he left Spain for France. There, Panndorf was imprisoned until the end of March 1939. Due to his Soviet citizenship, he was spared extradition to Germany and was able to return to his family in Moscow on 1 April 1939.

== Soviet spy ==
When he returned home to the Soviet Union, Panndorf resumed working as a master craftsman at the "Ordschonikidse" factory. Immediately after Germany's invasion of the Soviet Union, Panndorf was recruited by the 5th Department of Red Army intelligence. During the war, selected German émigrés had the opportunity to be deployed as paratroopers, partisans or members of certain special formations in the enemy's rear. Panndorf was one of about 50 German émigrés who trained to become intelligence agents.

During training by the Comintern, the German participants were prepared militarily, politically and in terms of intelligence for their deployment. Above all, Spanish fighters who had military experience such as Panndorf received two months of training in Petrovsk from August 1941. Here the participants were prepared for their future missions as a Soviet GRU agent that conducted military reconnaissance (known as a Scout in Soviet parlance). They received military training, which included making explosives and false identity papers, as well as photography, ciphering techniques and wireless telegraphy, parachuting, armed self-defence and driving.

After the basic training was completed, Panndorf attended the International Lenin School, a Comintern school. While there, Panndorf received political, physical and moral training. He learned how to distribute leaflets and write pamphlets on basic military training. They also dealt with the theoretical foundations of the communist movement, the ideology of Nazism and current war events.

Almost all of the graduates of these first training courses were deployed as Soviet military reconnaissance agents. The largest operation took place in May 1942, when several participants – including Panndorf – parachuted individually or in groups over German territory. Their scouting mission took place at a time when the German resistance around Schulze-Boysen/Harnack in Berlin was in the process of transmitting information about German attack plans and equipment to Soviet agencies by radio contact. In addition, important resistance groups existed around the KPD in Saxony and Thuringia. The German émigrés sent were to support these groups and build up further networks. Espionage and sabotage in military and armaments objects as well as reconnaissance of the domestic political situation in the German Reich were also tasks of the scouts.

== Mission ==
On the night of 16–17 May 1942, Panndorf whose code name was "Stepanow", along with Willi Börner and Erna Eifler and Wilhelm Fellendorf, began the mission as part of the first group jump. Panndorf and Börner formed one operational group and parachuted over a patch of forest close to the city of Allenstein in East Prussia. Their equipment included appropriate funds and identification papers, rations for ten days, and a revolver and hand grenades. For Panndorf, this was the first time in almost a decade since he was in his homeland.

However, the parachute jump ended with a tree landing, resulting in arm and leg injuries. For this reason, Panndorf and Börner decided to leave some of the equipment and the heavy radio behind and bury it. This was a decisive disadvantage for the connection to Moscow. Nevertheless, both of them, whose assigned area of operations was in Saxony and Thuringia, were able to make their way to their provisional destination in Meerane.

After a short stay in Meerane, they tried and failed to establish contact with Moscow. On 24 May, they sought refuge with Börner's family in Crimmitschau. From here, Panndorf tried to contact resistance groups in Thuringia around Magnus Poser and Theodor Neubauer through his sister Elly Oertel. This failed, however, because Panndorf's sister filed a complaint with the Gestapo. As a result, a manhunt was launched with a reward of 10,000 Reichsmarks. In addition, on 28 May 1942, the Reich Security Main Office (RSHA) ordered a targeted search for parachutists. Since Panndorf and Börner no longer felt safe in Crimmitschau, they separated and agreed to meet in Innsbruck. However, no further contact was made there, whereupon Panndorf decided on 5 June 1942 to make his way to Berlin in order to receive support from a contact there.

On 10 June, Panndorf arrived in Berlin at the home of Rudolf Scheffel, whom he knew from their joint party and youth work in Gera. At that time Scheffel ran a dairy shop in Schönow, which served as an illegal meeting place for a group of friends around Felix and Käthe Tucholla. The Tuchollas helped Panndorf find accommodation in Berlin, including with KPD members Kurt Bietzke and Richard Hinkelmann. From Hinkelmann, Panndorf received confidential information from the Propaganda Ministry and other important materials. He received passports, money and ration cards from Bietzke. Panndorf informed the Tuchollas and Scheffel about his mission and they provided information about the domestic political situation as well as the resistance in Germany and their own resistance group, which was being formed.

== Arrest ==
Panndorf continued to re-establish contact with Börner with Käthe Tucholla acting as his proxy in Meerane during the search. However, in the process, she was arrested by the Gestapo on 25 July 1942. Unknown to Panndorf, Börner had already been arrested. The arrest of Käthe Tucholla led to the uncovering of her network in Berlin. A wave of arrests followed by the Gestapo, during which Panndorf and Felix Tucholla and a further seven contacts were imprisoned on 27 July 1942. The last member of the group to be arrested was Rudolf Scheffel on 2 August 1942. Panndorf was transferred to the Sachsenhausen concentration camp. He made no statements about his intelligence activities. Even before the trial against him could begin, Panndorf was executed in the camp on 10 December 1942. Investigations into his death were to be omitted on the instructions of the Gestapo headquarters in Berlin.

Panndorf's family were only informed of his fate in 1969. At the invitation of Gera Lord Mayor Horst Pohl, his daughter Ilsa Nesterenko visited the town in 1969 and 1975.

== Historical research ==
The deployment of German communists like Panndorf, who took up the anti-fascist resistance struggle in the interest of the Soviet Union, was evaluated very differently in the two German states in the post-war period. At first, the deployment was largely kept quiet until the end of the 1960s. Only then were the actors around Panndorf honoured in East Germany (GDR) as role models and heroic fighters against fascism and often portrayed as standing in the tradition of the GDR. Panndorf was first mentioned in a newspaper article in the Gera newspaper Volkswacht. In the article it stated:

"Erwin Panndorf loved life because he believed in the socialist future of our fatherland. He hated the enemies of the German nation, German imperialism and militarism. That is why he was always ready to give his life for the cause of the German and international workers' movement, for the happiness of his people and the peace of the world."

In 1970, a biographical work by the Gera district leadership of the Socialist Unity Party of Germany (SED) was published, reprinted in 1984, in which Panndorf was portrayed in an equally heroic manner. Panndorf was also mentioned in other publications on anti-fascist resistance and the history of German-Soviet friendship and presented as an "outstanding example of German-Soviet friendship and the resistance struggle against fascism".

In West Germany, the paratroopers and scouts were for a long time devalued as so-called "mercenaries of the NKVD" and "agents of Moscow" or their deployment was kept quiet altogether. There was no more detailed publication on Panndorf and his deployment. In an article in Der Spiegel of 24 June 1968, however, he was named as part of "infiltrated Soviet spies" who succeeded in driving some members of the group around Schulze-Boysen/Harnack "into the maelstrom of Russian espionage".

In the literature after 1990, the paratroopers are often referred to as "Himmelfahrtskommandos" (suicide squad). According to this, they were sacrificed and at the same time jointly responsible for the deaths of other resistance fighters. In addition, they had hardly done their tasks, if at all, and therefore the results of their work had been insignificant. In contrast, there are also more recent publications on Panndorf in the output of the Rosa Luxemburg Foundation, which also bring to light other findings (including Panndorf's Spain Report). Here, the historian Ronald Sassning in his assessment states that although Panndorf's commando enterprise was extremely risky, Panndorf succeeded in "building up the core of a small intelligence group of communists, which also found selfless material support on the part of some non-party people."

== Awards and honours ==
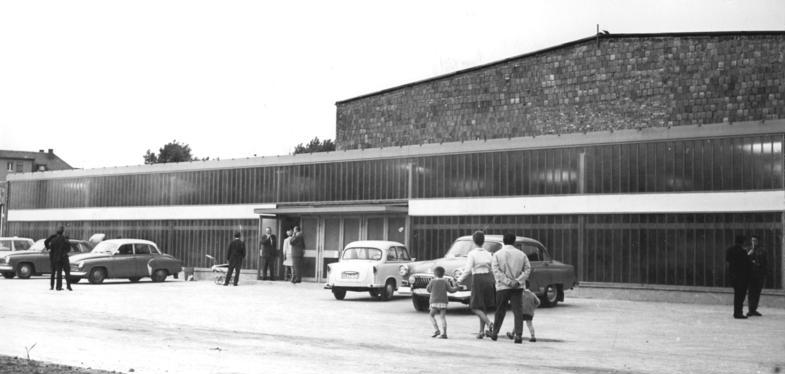
The old Erwin-Panndorf sports hall in Gera on 23 April 1969

From 1967 onwards, numerous tributes were paid to Panndorf. A commemorative plaque was unveiled on his birthplace in 1967 with the inscription:

"Erwin Panndorf was born in this house on 7 Jan. 1904. Commissioner of the CC of the KPD. Organiser and resistance fighter against fascism. Murdered in Sachsenhausen concentration camp on 10 Dec. 1942."

Panndorf's name is also listed on a plaque of honour for the fallen resistance fighters against fascism in the Socialist Memorial in Berlin-Friedrichsfelde, on the right inner side of the circular wall. In addition, several institutions in Gera – schools, sports facilities, units of the National People's Army (NVA) and work collectives – were given Panndorf's name. For example, the Sports and Congress Hall, which was newly built on 2 June 1968. He was also honoured in the Soviet Union. At the Moscow machine-building plant "Ordzhonikidze", a display case in the company museum commemorated Panndorf.
