= Otto Niebergall =

German politician (1904–1977)

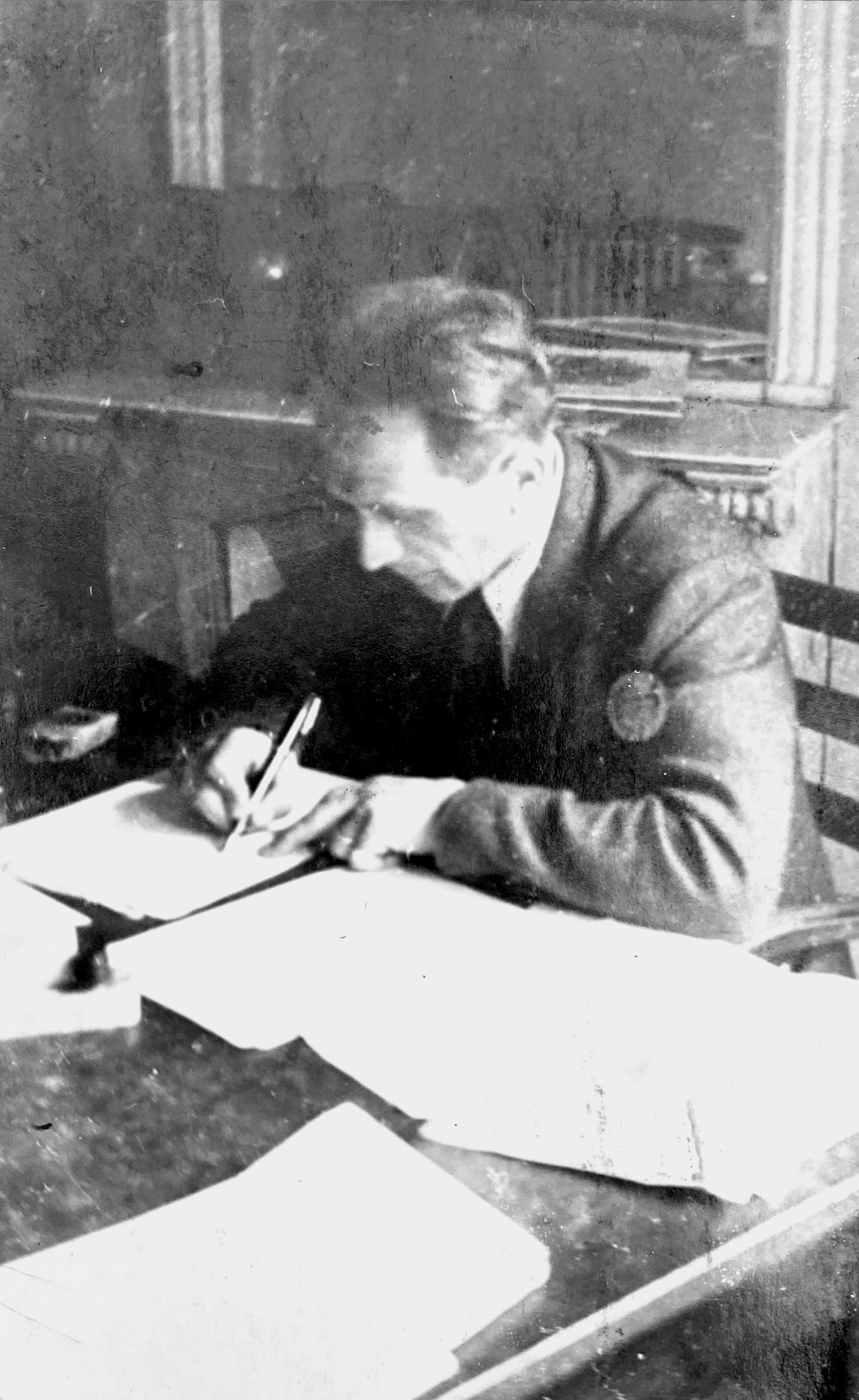
- Otto Niebergall in 1949

Member of the Bundestag
- In office 1949–1953

Personal details
- Born: 5 January 1904; Kusel, German Empire
- Died: 13 February 1977 (aged 73); Mainz, West Germany
- Political party: German Communist Party (1968–); Communist Party of Germany (1922–1956)
- Spouse: Barbara "Bebi" Hertel (1930)
- Occupation: Political activist Politician

Otto Niebergall (5 January 1904 – 13 February 1977) was a German politician (KPD). During the twelve Nazi years, most of which he spent abroad, he was a resistance activist.

After 1945 many of those who before 1933 had been committed members of the Communist Party of Germany and who lived in what in 1949 became West Germany, moved across to the Soviet sponsored zone, which after 1949 became communist East Germany. Others stopped being communists or ceased to involve themselves in politics. Otto Niebergall continued to be a politically engaged Communist politician. For much of the time he managed to combine this with living in West Germany, which was unusual.

== Life ==
=== Early years ===
Otto Niebergall was born into a working-class family just outside Kusel, a small industrial town in the hills to the north-east of Saarbrücken. He trained for work as a machinist, an electrician and a miner, and these were the sectors in which he worked as a young man. In 1918 he was a co-founder of the Saarbrücken Young Socialists ("Arbeiterjugend") group. He was also actively engaged in the local branch of the Metal Workers' Union ("Deutscher Metallarbeiter-Verband" / DMV). In 1920 he relocated to Hamborn in the Ruhr region which at this time, like the Saarland, remained under French military occupation. In Hamborn, still aged only 16, he joined the Young Communists, in which he subsequently became a member of the district leadership team ("Unterbezirksleitung"). The early 1920s were years of desperate austerity and of widespread quasi-military civil unrest in many parts of Germany. Niebergall joined the "Red Ruhr Army", established in the area as a response to the Freikorps units of unemployed demobilised former soldiers which had emerged in the aftermath of military defeat, and which continued to be active despite the failure in 1920 of the Kapp Putsch.

=== After the revolutions ===
Around 1922 he moved back to Saarbrücken and joined the recently formed Communist Party of Germany. Between 1924 and 1935 he was a member of the secretariat of the Communist Party for the Saar region leadership. He was elected to the leadership team ("Bezirksleitung") itself in 1925. In 1925 he also became area leader for the quasi-military Alliance of Red Front-Fighters ("Roter Frontkämpferbund" / RFB) and a member of the party's "Military-Political Structure" ("Militärpolitischer Apparat"), the title by which the party identified its intelligence/information service. He also represented the Communist Party as a Saarbrücken municipal councillor between 1926 or 1929 (sources differ) and, formally, 1935.

In 1930 Otto Niebergall married Barbara "Bebi" Hertel whose political outlook was broadly similar to his own. Widespread economic destitution returned at the end of the 1920s as the aftermath of the Wall Street Crash spread round the globe. In Germany the government responded to the ensuing surge in political extremism with a range of measures that included outlawing the RFB. Niebergall nevertheless led and sustained the organisation in the region, as a result of which, in 1932, he received an eleven month prison sentence, which he served in Zweibrücken.

=== Nazi years ===
The political context changed in January 1933 when the Nazis took power and lost little time in transforming Germany into a one-party dictatorship. In the carefully choreographed aftermath of the Reichstag fire at the end of February activists and politicians associated with the (shortly to become illegal) Communist Party found themselves high on the government target list. Many were arrested while others fled abroad. In the short-term, however, German communists in the Saarland were in less danger than those in other parts of Germany because the territory was still occupied by the French army. Between March and October 1934 Otto Niebergall did indeed travel abroad, in order to attend the Comintern's International Lenin School in Moscow. Barbara stayed behind, campaigning against unification of the territory with Nazi Germany, a matter which was nevertheless settled in favour of the German government by an overwhelming referendum vote in January 1935.

In February 1935, a few weeks after that referendum vote, the Niebergalls fled to France. Otto became for a time the area leader for the Communist Party in the Saarland and Rhenish Palatinate. Sources are vague about where he was when, but he appears to have conducted his political activity from abroad, planning escape routes out of Nazi Germany and organising the production and distribution inside Germany of political German-language newspapers. In 1936 he received a special assignment from Herbert Wehner, a member of the party's exiled leadership team still at this point based in Paris who was co-ordinating the party's "foreign policy". In July of that year a military coup in Spain triggered the outbreak of the Spanish Civil War. Niebergall was mandated to use his contacts to organise and deploy a group of volunteers and material in order to fight against a threatened Fascist take-over in Spain. He was travelling a good deal during this period, but sources indicate that between 1937 and 1940 he was based in Brussels, organising Civil War support and at the same time continuing, as a regional party leader responsible for his home territory and the surrounding regions, attempting to create a "Popular Front" movement in the Saarland. In January/February 1939 Niebergall was a delegate to the party's "Berne Conference". The naming of the conference after the Swiss capital was a mark of the need for secrecy felt by the exiled German communists attending it. The conference actually took place at Draveil, just outside Paris, on the city's south side.

War resumed in September 1939, and after eight months during which western Europe held its breath, on 10/11 May 1940 the German army invaded Belgium. Otto Niebergall was arrested on 11 May 1940 while Barbara, with their son who was only a few months old, stayed behind in Brussels. Barbara Niebergall would be arrested in Brussels by the Gestapo in 1941. Identified, eventually, as a "political prisoner" she would spend the later war years in the women's concentration camp at Ravensbrück, but survived. By that time her husband had been deported to the south-west of France where he was interned at Saint-Cyprien in a camp set up a couple of years earlier to accommodate returning fighters from the Spanish Civil War. The camp (which would close down in October 1940) had not been constructed with high security in mind and Otto Niebergall escaped from it on 13 July 1940.

In September 1940 he became a leader of the German Communist Party, based in Toulouse. He achieved significant promotion within the exiles party during the next few years, described by April 1941 as a leader of the German Communist Party leadership for France, Belgium and Luxemburg. In effect there appears to have been a German contingent within the French Resistance. Niebergall was a leading member of it, identified by the code name "Gaston".

He became the first president of the "Free Germany Committee for the west" ("Comité Allemagne libre pour l'ouest" / C.A.L.P.O.), inaugurated in September 1943, inspired (and encouraged) by the inauguration of an equivalent organisation by exiled German communists in Moscow a couple of months earlier. This brought him into contact with Willi Kreikemeyer and Harald Hauser in connection with fund transfers from the United States of America through the mysterious Noel Field. Niebergall also worked closely with the remarkable Luise Kraushaar who is described in at least one source as his secretary during much of his time with the French Resistance. He remained the organisation's president even after the 1944 liberation of Paris in which he participated, and following which the C.A.L.P.O. ceased to be illegal in newly liberated parts of France and - at least in the Paris region which quickly became a magnet for refugees from further east - transformed itself into a desperately needed welfare organisation, providing support for the most acutely needy war victims. An important priority, even under circumstances in which communication could be hugely challenging, was for covert co-ordination to maintain contact with resistance groups inside Germany. It later became clear that during the fighting which preceded the liberation of Paris in August 1944 he was in contact with resistance activists inside Germany plotting to assassinate Hitler.

=== After the war: two Germanys ===
Otto Niebergall returned to Saarbrücken in August 1945. The western two thirds of Germany was now divided into four large military occupation zones. As after the previous great war, however, special arrangements applied to the Saarland which would continue to be administered as a "French protectorate" till 1956. Between 1945 and 1948 Niebergall served as the party's chairman of the zone secretariat - effectively local Communist Party leader - for the French occupation zone (which included, but extended far beyond, the Saar Protectorate). During 1946/47 and again, after the restoration of democratic processes, between 1953 and 1957, he served as a municipal councillor in Saarbrücken. Between 1946 and 1949 he was also a member of the central committee of the newly created Socialist Unity Party ("Sozialistische Einheitspartei Deutschlands" / SED). The SED had been launched in the Soviet occupation zone through a contentious merger involving the Communist Party and the Social Democrats. After 1949 would become the ruling party in the German Democratic Republic, a new kind of German one-party dictatorship. As matters turned out the SED never gained traction further west, in the British, American and French occupation zones; but in 1946 Germany's semi-permanent postwar division was far from a foregone conclusion, and the Soviet backed authorities in East Berlin, increasingly mistrusted in the west, appear to have been looking for ways to use the SED as part of a scheme to bring the whole of Germany into the Soviet sphere of influence. It was only after the events of 1949 that the Inner German border became a fixed reality both physically and in the minds of men, and any residual links between Niebergall and the East German ruling party became less important that his continuing membership, in what became West Germany, of the surviving Communist Party of Germany. The French military governor, Gilbert Grandval, expelled Otto Niebergall from the French occupied Saarland in 1947. In the western occupation zones Soviet-style communism found little support, but in the Saarland, with its concentration of mining and heavy industry, leftwing politics had deep roots: during and after 1946 the Soviets and their allies worked hard to enhance political links between the Saar Protectorate and the Soviet occupation zone (later East Germany).

Niebergall had not been expelled from the entire French occupation zone, and in 1948 he settled in Mainz together with his wife, Barbara, his wife's youngest sister, Irma Strauch and his young son. The boy had been very young when Barbara Niebergall had been arrested by the Gestapo, and since that time he had been looked after and bought up by Irma, his aunt. Between May 1948 and February 1950 Niebergall served as party chairman for Rhineland-Palatinate. He also served as a national politician, a member of the West German parliament ("Bundestag") between 1949 and 1953.

The Communists received 15 seats in the 1949 West German election, but over the next four years rising Cold War tensions, the involvement of Soviet troops in brutal of the June 1953 uprising over in East Germany, and a growing perception that the Communist Party in West Germany was not so much a movement focused on workers' rights as an ill-disguised tool of a threatening Soviet foreign policy all sapped electoral support. In the 1953 election the party failed to obtain a sufficient national vote share to break through the 5% threshold needed to obtain seats in the Bundestag. Niebergall spent much or all of his time over the next couple of years in East Berlin from where, between 1953 and 1955, he headed up the Central Party Control Commission of the Communist Party. Since the Communist Party had effectively ceased to exist in East Germany back in 1946 when it had been subsumed into the Socialist Unity Party, this placed him in the anomalous position of heading up from East Germany a commission that purported to be responsible for enforcing party discipline in a (declining) Communist Party that restricted its activities to West Germany. These contradictions may explain why in 1955 he formally returned to the Saarland.

The party was banned in August 1956 by the Federal Constitutional Court of Germany. The ban was "due to the aggressive and combative methods that the party used in its Marxist-Leninist party struggle to achieve its goals". From the perspective of one relatively sympathetic source Otto Niebergall now faced renewed persecution. Since returning to the west Niebergall had sat as a Communist member of the municipal council of Saarbrücken, a position that he now lost. He returned once again to East Germany. In the east he was a member, between 1957 and 1971, of the (West German) Communist Party Central Committee (which would have been illegal if he had returned to the west).

Despite continuing political rivalry, after the death of Joseph Stalin in 1953, at first imperceptibly, cold war tensions between the two parts of Germany became less acute, or at least slightly less unmanageable. 1968 saw the creation in West Germany of the German Communist Party. The name was different, but only slightly. Much the same could be said for the politics, the close links to the Soviet sponsored East German sister party, and the party membership. But the "new" party was not banned. Otto Niebergall joined in 1968, becoming in 1971 a member of the regional party executive in Rhineland-Palatinate, and becoming head of the new party's History Commission. In or before 1971 he relocated from east to west for the last time, again making his home in Mainz. However, by now he was for most purposes retired. In 1972 he was elected chairman of the "Interests Association of German Former Resistance Fighters ("Interessengemeinschaft ehemaliger Deutscher Widerstandskämpfer" / IEDW).

Otto Niebergall died on 14 February 1977 in Mainz.

== Awards and honours ==
- 1970 Order of Karl Marx
- Star of People's Friendship
- Order of Lenin
- Medal of the Liberation
