= Reichenschwand =

- Municipality
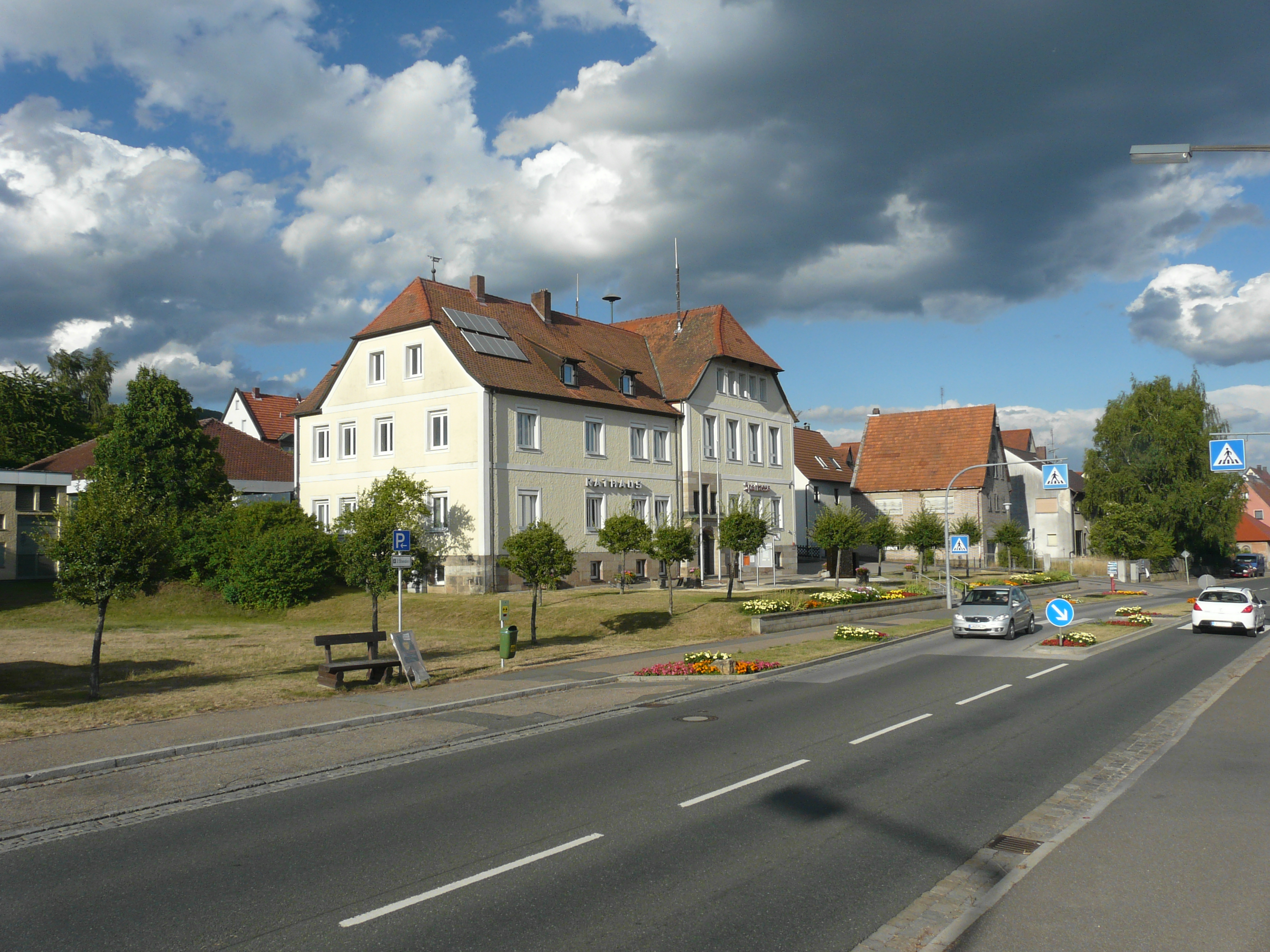
- Town hall

- Coat of arms

- Location of Reichenschwand within Nürnberger Land district
- Interactive map of Reichenschwand
- Location within Germany Location within Bavaria
- Coordinates: 49°30′54″N 11°22′19″E
- Country: Germany
- State: Bavaria
- Admin. region: Mittelfranken
- District: Nürnberger Land
- Subdivisions: 3 Gemeindeteile

Government
  - Mayor (2020–26): Manfred Schmidt

Area
  - Total: 6.84 km^{2} (2.64 sq mi)
- Elevation: 345 m (1,132 ft)

Population (2025-12-31)
  - Total: 2,461
  - Density: 360/km^{2} (932/sq mi)
- Time zone: UTC+01:00 (CET)
  - Summer (DST): UTC+02:00 (CEST)
- Postal codes: 91244
- Dialling codes: 09151
- Vehicle registration: LAU, ESB, HEB, N, PEG
- Website: www.reichenschwand.de

Reichenschwand (German pronunciation: [ˈʁaɪçn̩ˌʃvant]) is a municipality in the district of Nürnberger Land in Bavaria in Germany.
