= Anti-Nazi resistance =

Anti-Nazi resistance may refer to:

- Anti-Nazism
- German resistance to Nazism
- Resistance during World War II
- Jewish resistance in German-occupied Europe
