= Erna Eifler =

German resistance fighter

Erna Frida Eifler (born 31 August 1908, Berlin - died 8 April or 7 June 1944, Ravensbrück concentration camp) was a German steno typist secretary who became a communist, resistance fighter, Soviet GRU agent (known as a Scout in Soviet parlance) and courier.

In 1942, Eifler, along with GRU agent (and husband) Wilhelm Fellendorf, was trained by Soviet intelligence in sabotage, wireless telegraphy and parachuting. In May 1942, they were both parachuted into East Prussia by a Russian bomber, with separate missions to contact members of a Berlin-based resistance organisation that was later known as the Red Orchestra ("Rote Kapelle") and conduct spying operations. Eifler's task in Berlin was to re-establish contact with Ilse Stöbe and through her, contact Rudolf von Scheliha, Unable to complete their separate missions, they travelled to Hamburg where they were hidden by Fellendorf's mother. There they made contact with Bernhard Bästlein and hid at the safehouse of Viktor Priess. The couple were eventually arrested by the Gestapo. After completing a Funkspiel operation, Eifler was sent to Ravensbrück concentration camp where she was executed in 1944, aged 35.

== Life ==
Eifler grew up an orphan, the third child, after her father, Hermann Eifler, a lithographer died in 1919 and mother died in 1922, leaving her and her four siblings orphaned. After attending school, Eifler completed a commercial apprenticeship to train to work as a stenographer. In her youth, Eifler joined the Young Communist League of Germany. By 1926, Eifler was a member of Communist International (Comintern). From 1928 to January 1930 she worked for the Soviet Trade Delegation in Hamburg. In 1930, she moved to Moscow to work as a stenographer for Metallo-Import, seconded from the Delegation.

== Career ==
When Eifler returned to Germany, she became a member of the Communist Party of Germany (KPD) in 1931 and worked in collaboration with the chemist Walter Caro in the AM Apparat, a department of the KPD that collected intelligence on factories and other works. During this period, she also worked as a stenographer in Wilhelm Bahnick's group in the BB apparatus (Betriebs-Beobachtung, operational observation department) of the KPD, while using the name "Gerda Sommer". Bahnick was a German Comintern member.

In February 1935, Eifler returned to the Soviet Union where she worked for the 5th Department of Red Army intelligence. From the start of 1936 to August 1938, she worked undercover in a deployment in China along with Caro. In China, Eifler used the alias "Kaethe Glanz". When she returned in 1938, she retrained to become an intelligence agent in Europe. She completed a wireless telegraphy and cryptography training course at a Red Army intelligence school in Skhodnya. In August 1939, Eifler was deployed to work in the Netherlands. At the start of the war, she returned to the Soviet Union. She undertook further training in radio and parachuting in Petrovsk and Kuibyshev.

== Germany mission ==
On the night of 16–17 May 1942, Eifler parachuted into a location close to the city of Allenstein in East Prussia with her husband, Wilhelm Fellendorf, and two other agents, Erwin Panndorf and Willi Börner, in a veritable suicide mission. (Note: The activities of this group is known, only due to the work of Gertrud Bobek and Leni Berner who worked in the group. Bobbek produced a book "Erinnerungen an mein Leben : aufgeschrieben in Taucha in den Jahren 1965 bis 1985" (Memories of my life: written down in Taucha in the years 1965 to 1985) where she described how she and here husband Felix Bobek worked with Gerda Sommer (the alias Eifler was using). "Gerda delivered the material we had to photograph for a long time. She loved to dress a bit conspicuously, which drew attention to her unnecessarily and was therefore criticised by us ... She spoke(d) of Martin (Bahnick) in an arrogant tone, which outraged us, and had(d) extravagant trains of thought".) Eifler and Fellendorf formed one operational group, Panndorf and Börner formed the other operational group. Each group arrived with identity documents, food stamps, money and a wireless telegraphy radio set. After about 10 days, the couple reached Berlin. While there, Fellendorf and the other two agents were to scout military objects as well as determine troop strengths and movements. Eifler's task in Berlin was to re-establish contact with Ilse Stöbe and through her, contact Rudolf von Scheliha, She had been given Stöbe's address, as well as those of Emil Hübner and his daughter, Frida Wesolek. However, Eifler found Stöbe was working in Dresden at the time and was unable to make contact with either Hübner or Wesolek.

Unable to get permanent accommodation, Eifler and Fellendorf decided to go to Hamburg where Fellendorf's mother lived, in the hope of finding some communist connections. When they were established in Hamburg, they tried to retrieve their buried WT sets and found they had disappeared. After speaking to another parachutist Walter Gersmann, who had been dropped on 18–19 May, they found he had been captured by the Gestapo and was now working as a double agent (Note: Known in Germany as V-Mann, short for Vertrauens-mann. (German:V-Mann, plural V-Leute), they were arrested prisoners, who were committed to spying activity for the Gestapo, who promised severe punishment such as the death penalty, if they refused.) for the Gestapo. He had given away the position of the radio sets and they'd been confiscated by the Gestapo.

Through contacts, they managed to meet Bernhard Bästlein who was part of the communist Bästlein-Jacob-Abshagen Group. Bästlein thought they were initially provocateurs and made no secret of the fact. Bästlein referred them to Red Army intelligence officer Viktor Priess who worked in the Bästlein organisation. Together with his mother, Marie Priess and his brother Heinz, they hid Eifler and Fellendorf at Marie's apartment which was used as a safehouse. While there, Eifler and Fellendorf prepared a 5-page report titled: "General Staff of the Red Army, Dept. V, for the attention of Gen. Bolshakov" dated 10 September 1942 that contained a meticulous description of the activities of the parachutists up to that point.

In the report, Eifler tried to address the source of treachery that led to the arrests of the other parachutists. They asked several questions in the report, which could only have been caused by betrayal from the "Moscow headquarters", namely, how did the Gestapo gain knowledge of their landing site, the real names of the parachutists and the incorrect information on the group that Eifler was supposed to contact and the non-functioning contact points in Berlin that Eifler was supposed to use. In asking these questions, Eifler and Fellendorf hoped for clarification. Bästlein made the arrangements to forward the report via a courier, but it was intercepted by the Gestapo.

== Arrest, imprisonment and death ==
Eifler was arrested along with Marie and Heinz Priess in Hamburg on 15 October 1942. On 20 October, she was taken by train and jailed in the Alexanderplatz prison in Berlin, escorted by the Gestapo, where she was subject to enhanced interrogation by Gestapo officer Walter Habecker. Fellendorf was arrested on the 28 October and shot by the Gestapo on the same day.

Eifler took part in a German Funkspiel operation. Funkspiel, defined by the German name Funk meaning radio and spiel meaning play or performance, was a common counterintelligence technique where controlled information was transmitted over a captured agent's radio, where the agent's parent service had no knowledge that the agent had turned. It was undertaken for a number of reasons that included poisoning the source by conveying deceptive material, discovering important intelligence and identifying networks. The operation continued until March 1945.

On either 8 April or 7 June 1944, aged 35, Eifler was shot dead in Ravensbrück concentration camp.

== Bibliography ==
- Sandvoß, Hans-Rainer (2007). Die "andere" Reichshauptstadt Widerstand aus der Arbeiterbewegung in Berlin von 1933 bis 1945 (1st ed.). Berlin: Lukas Verlag für Kunst- und Geistesgeschichte. pp. 402–210. ISBN 978-3-936872-94-1. OCLC 951131851.
- Griebel, Regina; Coburger, Marlies; Scheel, Heinrich (1992). Erfasst? : das Gestapo-Album zur Roten Kapelle : eine Foto-Dokumentation (in German). Halle: Audioscop. p. 222. ISBN 3883840440. OCLC 29316949.
- Rosiejka, Gert (1986). Die Rota Kappelle : Landesverrat als antifaschististischer Widerstand (in German). Hamburg: Ergebnisse Verlag. ISBN 9783925622168. OCLC 497259004.
- Perrault, Gilles (1969). The Red Orchestra. New York: Schocken Books. ISBN 0805209522.
- Trepper, Léopold (1995). Die Wahrheit: Autobiographie des "Grand Chef" der Roten Kapelle (in German). Ahriman-Verlag GmbH. ISBN 978-3-89484-554-4.
