= Luise Kraushaar =

German political activist (1905–1989)

- Born: Luise Szepansky; 13 February 1905; Wedding (Berlin), Germany
- Died: 10 January 1989 (aged 83); East Berlin, German Democratic Republic (East Germany)
- Occupations: Political activist Historian
- Political party: KPD; SED

Luise Kraushaar (née Szepansky; 13 February 1905 – 10 January 1989) was a German political activist who became a Resistance campaigner against National Socialism and who also, after she left Germany, worked in the French Resistance. She later became a historian, employed at Berlin's Marxism–Leninism Institute in the German Democratic Republic (East Germany).

== Life ==
It is not clear when nor precisely how Luise Szepansky became Luise Kraushaar: sources generally refer to her as Luise Kraushaar throughout.

Luise Kraushaar was born in Berlin where her father worked as a graphic artist and painter (Malermeister). During the first part of her life the family lived in the working class inner city Wedding quarter, but by the time war broke out in July 1914 they had relocated to Mariendorf, a manufacturing town then on the southern edge of Berlin, and subsequently subsumed into it. In 1919 Kraushaar joined one of the Freie sozialistische Jugend (Free Socialist Youth) movements proliferating in the political and social turbulence that followed the end of the war. The next year she became a member of the newly formed Kommunistischer Jugendverband Deutschlands (KJVD / Young Communist League), later becoming president of its Mariendorf district branch.

She joined the ZdA (trades union) in 1923 and in 1924, the year of her nineteenth birthday, she became a member of Communist Party itself. She also attended a Lyceum (college) and completed a commercial training, which she was able to combine with trades union organisational activities in the ZdA.

Around 1930, Kraushaar took a secretarial post with the Communist Party, working for Leo Roth, a party officer identified in some quarters as "Viktor", with links to Moscow. Roth is sometimes identified as an "agent" or a man responsible for "special contacts", but his precise role remains shadowy. He is described in one source as the nationwide head of the German Communist Party's Industrial Reporting Agency (Betriebsberichterstattung / BB-Apparat).

Kraushaar's secretarial tasks involved "special duties" such as decoding encrypted messages, as well as typing up reports and lists of names. A bizarre aspect of her career at this time was that she worked in a room that the party had rented for her in a large residential apartment in Berlin's respectable but otherwise unremarkable Friedenau quarter. The apartment was home to two sisters, the elder of whom, Rosa Dukas, handled the rental of the room and the younger of whom, Helen Dukas, was employed as a secretary by one of Berlin's most famous residents, Albert Einstein. The sisters went out to work during the day, so that for most of the time she was working in it Kraushaar had the apartment to herself. Both Luise Kraushaar and Leo Roth had their own keys to the apartment. Work in the BB-Apparat also brought her into contact with Wilhelm Bahnik, another Communist activist who would oppose the Nazi government and in the end was killed in 1938 while participating in the Spanish Civil War. Kraushaar undertook secretarial work for Bahnik until she emigrated in early 1934, at which point her secretarial duties in Berlin were taken over by Erna Eifler, who would be murdered by gunshot at Ravensbrück in 1944.

Régime change came to Germany in January 1933 and the new government lost little time in transforming Germany into a one-party dictatorship. The Communist Party was banned and Kraushaar's work for it became illegal. In March 1934, Kraushaar escaped to Prague, moving on shortly afterwards to Moscow where she was employed in the Comintern News Service. For eighteen months from June 1934 she was working in the cipher department of the OMS, still at this point under the directorship of Abramov.

In December 1935, she was sent to Paris. By this time politically active Communists in Germany had been arrested or escaped abroad and Paris was becoming the de facto western headquarters for the German Communist Party in exile. In Paris, she continued her work in the cipher department for the Comintern News Service. Colleagues included Paula Rueß. From 1937 she was also working for a news agency headed up by Bruno Frei called "Nouvelles d'Allemagne" / "Deutsche Informationen", described as the press organ of the German People's Front (Volksfront) in Paris. In April 1939, she started working in a secretarial capacity for the Paris Emigrant Committee.

The resumption of war in September 1939 was followed, between Germany and France, by several months of political paralysis and uncertainty in France, but in May 1940 the German invasion of France moved matters on. A political response in both Britain and France involved identifying large numbers of politically and race-defined refugees from Nazi Germany as enemy aliens and arresting them. Kraushaar was arrested in May 1940 and detained by the French authorities at the Gurs internment camp in the south of the country. Fellow internees included Irene Wosikowski and Thea Saefkow, exiled German communists who had been based with Kraushaar in France ever since the three women had been sent to Paris from Moscow at the end of 1935. The three were able to team up together at the internment camp where, as Kraushaar subsequently recalled, Wosikowski, a committed sportswoman, organised other internees to become more physically active whether they liked it or not. Their stay in the camp was brief, however, as by the end of June 1940 the three had escaped to Toulouse. They joined a unit in the French Resistance. Working with German resistance members such as Kurt Hälker, Hans Heisel and Arthur Eberhard, who were serving inside the German army of occupation, the group was able to collect important operational information and pass it to the British and American military.

From December 1940, Kraushaar was working with Otto Niebergall who was the leader of the "Comité „Allemagne libre“ pour l'Ouest" (CALPO), a movement based in southern France which operated as a branch of the Moscow-based National Committee for a Free Germany ("Nationalkomitee Freies Deutschland" / NKFD). There is a record that in 1941 she saw the author Maria Leitner in Marseille in 1941. In November 1943 Kraushaar moved her own base to Marseille, continuing her work for the German Communist Party in exile as a contributor to a newspaper entitled "Unser Vaterland". During 1944/45, with the German occupation forces being pushed out of France, she was mandated by CALPO to undertake "antifascist" political work with German POWs.

The war ended, formally in May 1945, and Kraushaar returned to the Soviet occupation zone in what remained of Germany. In December 1945 she relocated to Hamburg in the British occupation zone. With the postwar division of Germany becoming progressively more pronounced, in May 1947 she moved back into the Soviet zone, working until 1952 as an instructor in the "central secretariat" of the newly formed Socialist Unity Party of Germany (Sozialistische Einheitspartei Deutschlands / SED), which, after October 1949, became the ruling party of a new German dictatorship, ruled separately from the three western occupation zones. She subsequently worked for a long time as a consultant with the East German Culture Ministry. In 1958 she became a researcher with the Central Party Archive and at the party's Marxism–Leninism Institute. Her research work and the party publications resulting from it focused on Germany's anti-fascist resistance movement during the Hitler years. She retired in December 1985.

== Awards and honours ==
- 1969 Patriotic Order of Merit
- 1980 Patriotic Order of Merit Gold clasp
