= Cologne–Aachen (electoral district) =

Former constituency of the Reichstag (Weimar Republic)

20 Cologne–Aachen Köln–Aachen
- Former electoral constituency for the Reichstag
- Location within the Weimar Republic
- State: Prussia
- Province: Rhine Province
- Electorate: 1,220,653 (1919); 1,567,280 (1933)
- Major settlements: Cologne, Aachen, Bonn

Former constituency
- Created: 1919
- Abolished: 1938

Cologne–Aachen was one of the 35 electoral districts (German: Wahlkreise) used to elect members to the Reichstag during the Weimar Republic. It sent members to the Reichstag in nine democratic elections between 1919 and 1933. It existed nominally in the show elections to the Nazi Reichstag until 1938.

It comprised the Regierungsbezirke of Cologne and Aachen from the Rhine Province within the Free State of Prussia. It was constituency 20 in the numbering scheme.

== Electoral system ==
The constituency was created for the 1919 election. Under the proportional representation electoral system of the Weimar Republic, voters cast a vote for party lists. Parties were awarded a seat for every 60,000 votes in a constituency. Excess votes were aggregated at two higher levels of seat distribution: an intermediate level combining multiple constituencies, where extra seats were awarded to parties' constituency lists, and a national level where seats were awarded to national lists of each party or alliance.

== Results (1919–1933) ==
=== Vote share ===
Party	1919	1920	1924 I	1924 II	1928	1930	1932 I	1932 II	1933
KPD			14.2	8.8	10.4	14.5	17.5	19.3	14.2
USPD	0.6	8.3	0.7	0.3	0.1	0.1			
SPD	25.5	20.0	10.2	15.4	18.5	14.2	14.6	14.7	12.0
DDP	7.6	4.1	2.8	3.6	3.2	2.9	0.3	0.3	0.3
Centre	59.7	51.9	48.5	51.2	42.0	36.4	40.5	39.3	35.9
DVP	3.4	9.0	7.8	8.0	8.5	4.9	1.2	2.3	1.4
WP			3.0	3.2	4.4	4.7	0.8	0.4	
DNVP	3.2	4.0	7.3	7.1	7.2	3.0	3.7	5.2	5.7
Nazi			1.5	0.6	1.1	14.5	20.2	17.4	30.0
Other		2.8	4.1	1.7	4.6	4.9	1.1	1.1	0.4
Turnout	79.7	70.0	70.1	69.4	66.4	78.2	80.7	74.3	85.1
Source: Wahlen in Deutschland

=== Deputies ===
Election	Distribution	Seats
1919		13
1920		11
May 1924		12
Dec 1924		12
1928		13
1930		18
Jul 1932		18
Nov 1932		16
1933		19
Source: Wahlen in Deutschland
