= Bästlein-Jacob-Abshagen Group =

German resistance group

The Bästlein-Jacob-Abshagen Group was a German resistance group that developed around the core members Bernhard Bästlein, Franz Jacob and Robert Abshagen. It fought the National Socialist (Nazi) regime from 1940 till the end of the war in 1945. It consisted of about 300 members in over 30 groups in Hamburg factories, making it the biggest regional Nazi resistance group in the history of Hamburg.

== History ==
In 1940, Bästlein, Jacob, Abshagen and Gustav Bruhn were released from Sachsenhausen concentration camp. They immediately set about building a Resistance organization after secret meetings with the remnants of various Resistance groups of the Communist Party of Germany and other small groups. The plan was to help promote the overthrow of the Nazi regime and end the war by concentrating on large Hamburg companies. Through extensive contacts, they were able to build a conspiratorial network in over 30 firms, primarily in the Hamburg shipyards. Their declared goals were to mobilize the workers, support the foreign forced laborers and the Soviet prisoners of war and to sabotage the weapons production. The group consisted of Communist Party members, some Social Democrats, independents and foreign forced laborers. The group promoted a socialist Germany allied with the Soviet Union, using leaflets that were, as a rule, distributed internally. Through Wilhelm Guddorf, they had contacts outside Hamburg, with the Rote Kapelle in Berlin and Leo Drabent and Hermann Böse in Bremen.

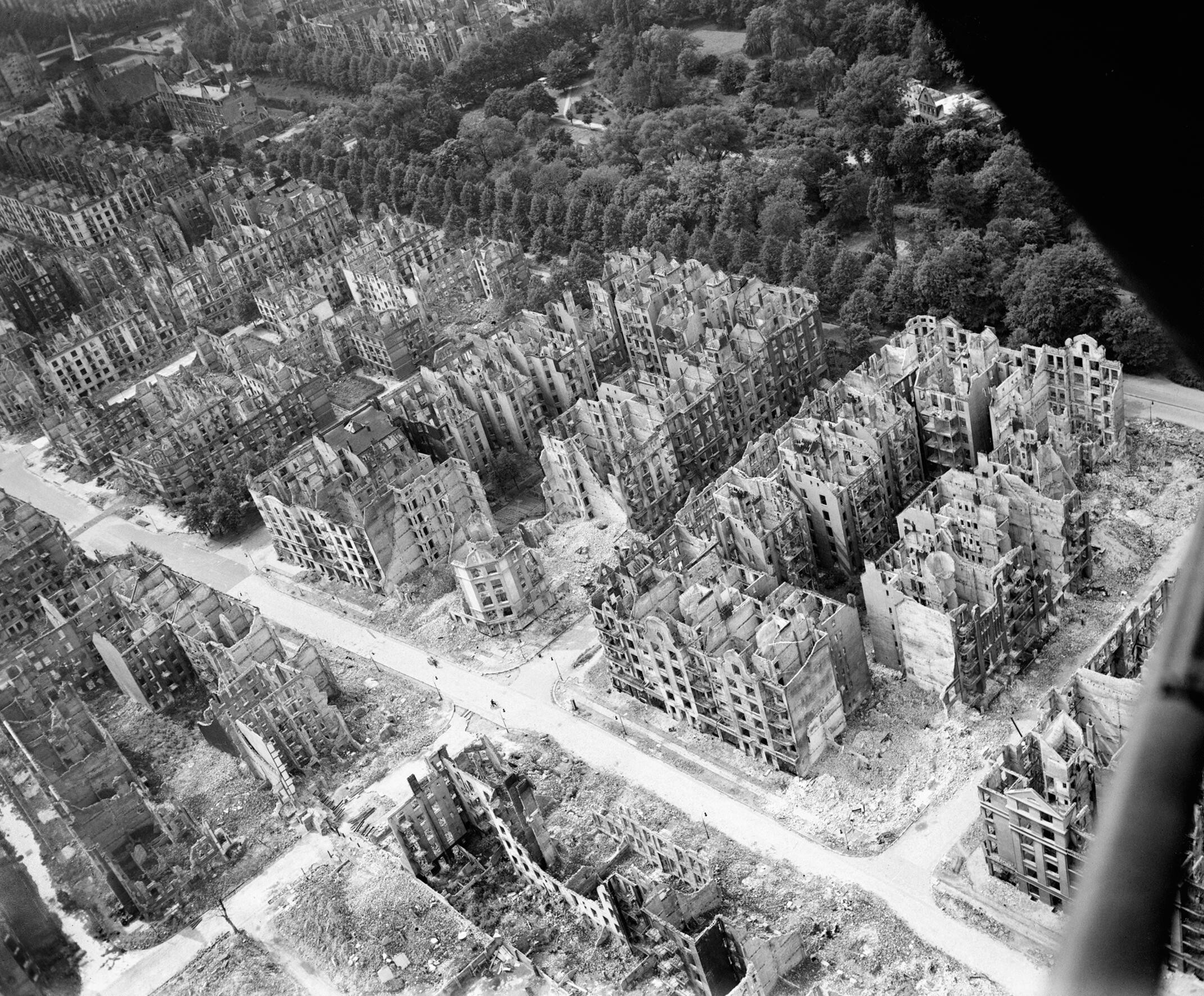
Typical bomb damage in Hamburg (aerial photo from 1944 or 1945)

In October 1942, the activities of the group were discovered by the Gestapo and more than 100 of their then roughly 200 members were arrested. Franz Jacob went underground in Berlin and with Anton Saefkow, established a new network of cells.

After heavy air raids on Hamburg in July and August 1943, the city was in shambles. 900,000 Hamburg residents had no more roof over their heads and water, gas and electricity were no longer guaranteed, much less food. The jails were in no better shape, so the decision was made to furlough 2,000 prisoners for two months, including about 50 Resistance fighters. Many of the furloughed prisoners immediately sought to resume their political work, underground. After a few months, most of them were arrested again. From May 1944, there were a number of trials known as the "Hamburg Communist Trials", in which numerous were given a death sentence and were hanged. In total, 70 members of the group were murdered between 1942 and 1945. Nevertheless, the group was able to sustain its activity till the final days of the war and Hamburg was surrendered to the Allies without a fight.

Other key group members were Walter Bohne, Gustav Bruhn, Hans Hornberger, Oskar Reincke, Kurt Schill and Heinz Priess.

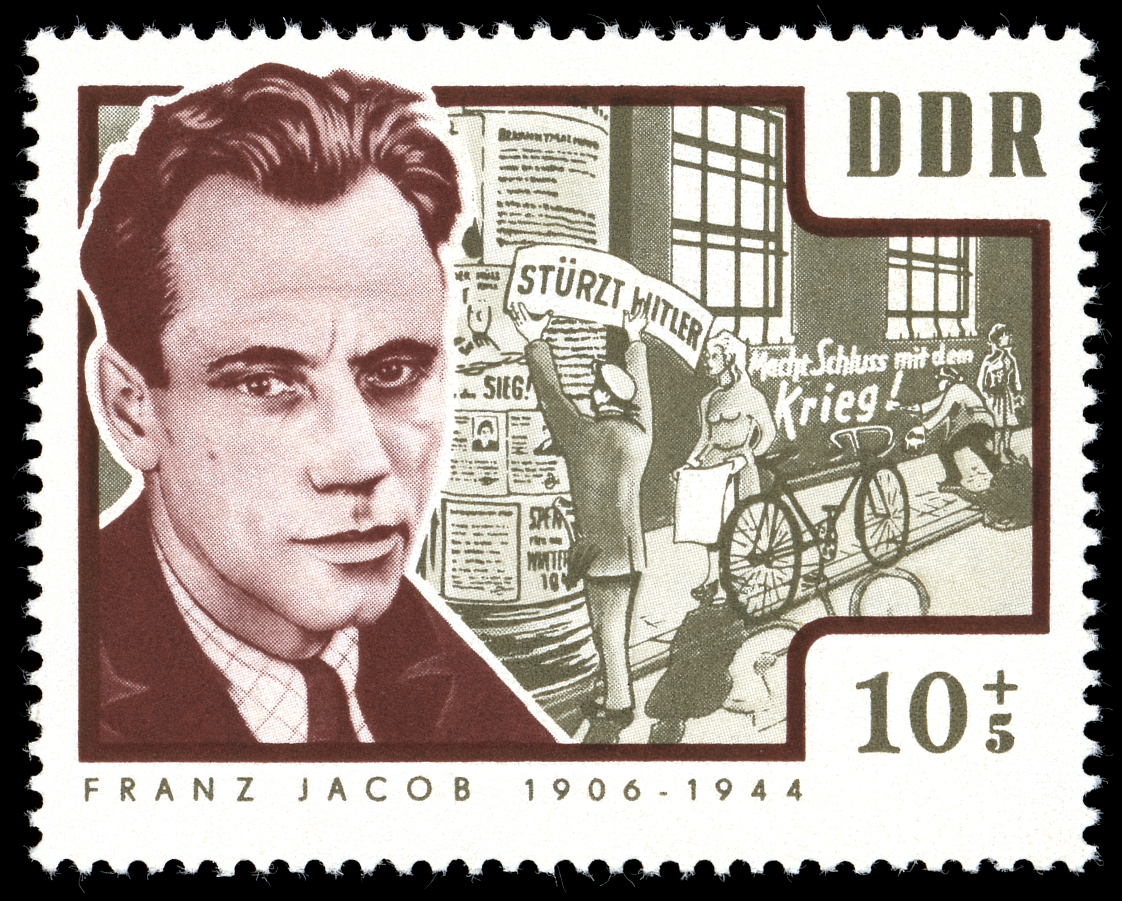
Franz Jacob, 1964 stamp from the DDR

== Honors and memorials ==
On September 8, 1946, 27 urns from murdered Resistance fighters from Hamburg were buried in a cemetery in Ohlsdorf. Included in that number were urns from Bernhard Bästlein, Franz Jacob and Heinz Priess. Other urns were later added for Robert Abshagen and other members of the group.

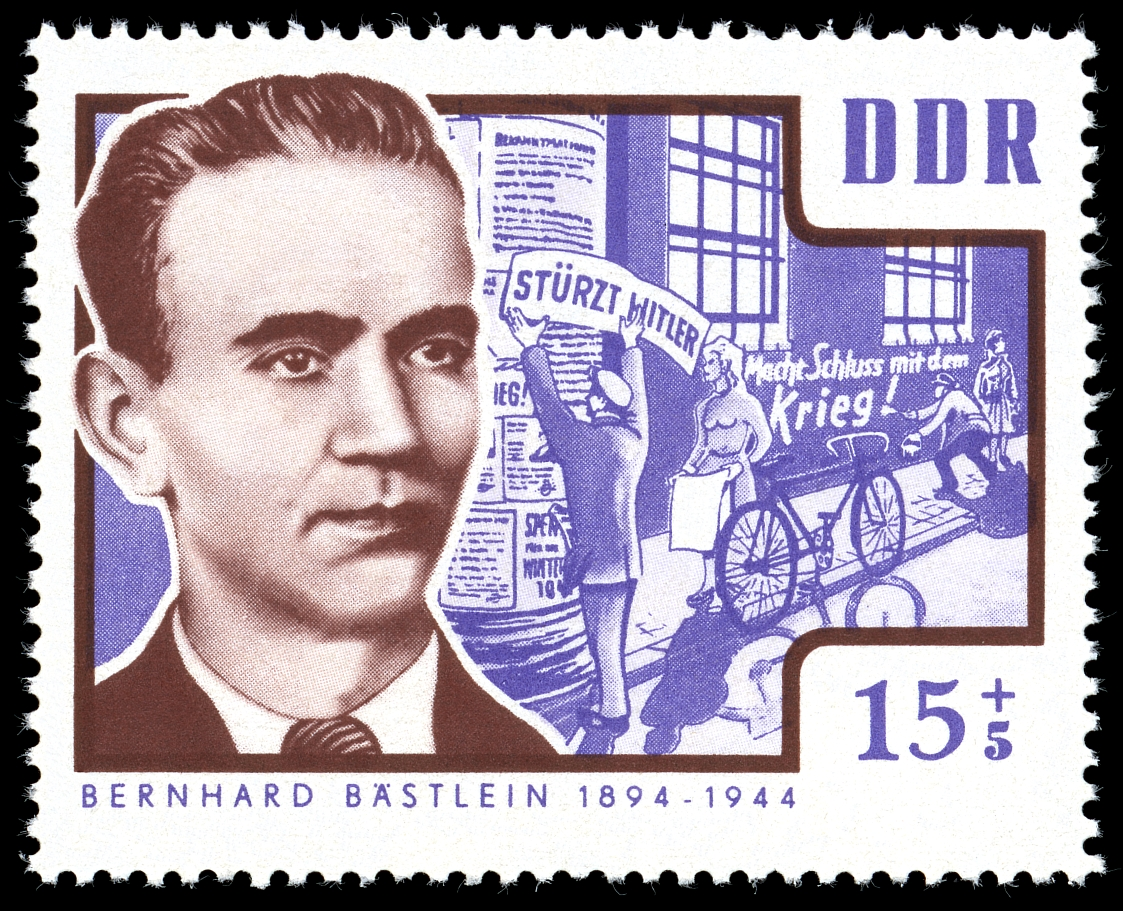
Bernhard Bästlein, 1964 stamp from the DDR

During the postwar years, the shop committee of Blohm & Voss had a commemorative plaque made, honoring the 11 murdered shipyard workers, which included eight members of the Bästlein-Jacob-Abshagen Group. In 1964, the postal service of the German Democratic Republic released a series of postage stamps on the occasion of the 20th anniversary of the execution of Saefkow, Jacob and Bästlein. There had already been a memorial series on athletes, which had honored Walter Bohne. During the 1980s, Hamburg's Office of Memorials, as part of its program, Stätten der Verfolgung und des Widerstandes ("Persecution and Resistance Sites"), unveiled a memorial plaque at the Thalia Theater in Hamburg, which had been one of the bases of the group.

Berlin has streets named for both Bernhard Bästlein and Franz Jacob and there have been Stolpersteine placed at former homes of Bästlein, Jacob and Abshagen.

== See also ==
- Saefkow-Jacob-Bästlein Organization
- List of Germans who resisted Nazism
- Katharina Jacob

== Bibliography ==
- Ursula Puls. Die Bästlein-Jacob-Abshagen-Gruppe. Bericht über den antifaschistischen Widerstandskampf in Hamburg und an der Wasserkante während des Zweiten Weltkrieges. Dietz, Berlin, German Democratic Republic (1959) (in German)
- Ursel Hochmuth. Widerstandsorganisation Bästlein-Jacob-Abshagen. Ursel Hochmuth and Gertrud Meyer, Editors, Streiflichter aus dem Hamburger Widerstand 1933–1945, Frankfurt am Main 1969, p. 342 (in German)
- Ursel Hochmuth: Niemand und nichts wird vergessen. Biogramme und Briefe Hamburger Widerstandskämpfer 1933–1945. Eine Ehrenhain-Dokumentation, Vereinigung der Verfolgten des Naziregimes – Bund der Antifaschistinnen und Antifaschisten e.V. Land Hamburg, VSA-Verlag, Hamburg (2005) ISBN 3-89965-121-9 (in German)
