= Wilhelm Guddorf =

Belgian journalist and resistance fighter (1902–1943)

- Wilhelm Guddorf holding a young child.
- Born: 20 February 1902; Melle, Belgium
- Died: 13 May 1943 (aged 41); Plötzensee Prison, Berlin, Germany
- Organization: Journalist

Wilhelm Guddorf (alias Paul Braun; 20 February 1902 – 13 May 1943) was a Belgian journalist, anti-Nazi and resistance fighter against the Third Reich. Guddorf was a leading member of a Berlin anti-fascist resistance group that was later called the Red Orchestra (Rote Kapelle) by the Abwehr. Guddorf was the editor of the Communist Die Rote Fahne (The Red Flag) newspaper.

== Life ==
Wilhelm Guddorf came from a middle-class Catholic family. His father, Ludwig Guddorf, taught German, literature, and Greek at the Maison de Melle educational institution in Melle, Belgium for 29 years. In 1899 he became a professor at the commercial college there. At the beginning of World War I, the family was expelled from the country as Reich Germans. They moved to Haselünne with five children without possessions. There Ludwig Guddorf found employment as a teacher at the Lateinschule (secondary school).

Wilhelm Guddorf, the eldest son of the family, attended the Latin School in Haselünne from 1915 to 1917, then the Royal Grammar School in Meppen and dropped out of school in the 12th grade because he had fallen out with his parents because of his "religious and moral views". The highly gifted student worked temporarily as a tutor on an estate in West Prussia. Nevertheless, he passed his school-leaving examination in Meppen in 1921 and began studying philology, philosophy, history, literary history and musicology in Münster. He later mastered all the major European and Slavic languages, plus Arabic, Latin, Greek and Hebrew.

In 1922 he joined the Communist Party of Germany (KPD). He worked for several communist newspapers and translated the foreign press for them. In autumn 1923, he was arrested for "preparation for high treason" and "violation of the Law for the Protection of the Republic". In November 1923 he managed to escape from the Sennestadt protective custody camp. In May 1926 he was caught, served a prison sentence and was released in August 1927. From 1923 he lived under the name Paul Braun. He also used this pseudonym to sign the articles he wrote, first for the KPD newspaper Freiheit in Düsseldorf, and from 1926-1933 for the official KPD party organ Rote Fahne - latterly as editor-in-chief of foreign affairs.

From 1933, using his pseudonym, he distributed illegal writings against the Nazi regime and was a member of the KPD district leadership of Berlin-Brandenburg. In April 1934 he was arrested and sentenced to three years in prison (in Luckau) for preparing for high treason. He was then placed in protective custody for two more years in Sachsenhausen concentration camp.

After he was released from Sachsenhausen, Guddorf developed contacts with members of a Berlin based anti-fascist group that was later called the Red Orchestra ("Rote Kapelle"), particularly around the groups associated with Harro Schulze-Boysen and Arvid Harnack in spring of 1940.

He was arrested once again in 1942 and in February 1943 was sentenced to death. He was executed at Plötzensee Prison in Berlin on 13 May 1943. In 1972, a street in Lichtenberg, a Berlin borough, was named after Guddorf.

== Leafletting ==
Guddorf was known to have cowritten some of the Agis leaflets along with John Rittmeister, Schulze-Boysen and others. The leaflets were produced by the Harnack and Schulze-Boysen Groups and had names like What is a Majority, Freedom and Violence and Call to the workers of the mind and fist not to fight against Russia. The Agis was a reference to the Spartan King Agis IV. The leaflets were distributed in Berlin and across Germany.

== Arrest ==
Guddorf was arrested on 20 October 1942. Under torture, Guddorf revealed the names of resistance members in Hamburg to the Gestapo, that lead to the arrest of some 85 people in the North Sea dockyards.

== Award and honours ==
- In 1972, the Berlin district of Lichtenberg named a street after Guddorf. The street is known as Wilhelm-Guddorf-Straße. The street is one of many that were renamed to honour the Rote Kapelle members e.g. Mildred-Harnack-Straße, Schulze-Boysen-Straße.
- In 1971, in the Berlin district of Köpenick a school in Rahnsdorf was renamed to Wilhelm Guddorf High School, Wilhelm-Guddorf-Oberschule The name remained in place until the Socialist Unity Party of Germany was dissolved and the German reunification commenced and by 1992 the parents, teachers and students decided to rename the school to Elementary School on the Püttbergen.

== Literature ==
- Coppi junior, Hans; Danyel, Jürgen; Tuchel, Johannes (1992). Die Rote Kapelle im Widerstand gegen Nationalsozialismus [The Red Chapel in opposition to Hitler. Writings of the Memorial of the German Resistance] (in German) (1st ed.). Berlin: Edition Hentrich. ISBN 978-3-89468-110-4.
- Rosiejka, Gert (1986). Die Rota Kappelle : Landesverrat als antifaschististischer Widerstand [The Rota Kappelle : Treason as an anti-fascist resistance] (in German) (1. ed.). Hamburg: Ergebnisse Verlag. ISBN 9783925622168. OCLC 497259004.
- Weber, Hermann; Herbst, Andreas (2008). Deutsche Kommunisten : biographisches Handbuch 1918 bis 1945 [German Communists : Biographical Manual 1918 to 1945] (in German) (2. ed.). Berlin: K. Dietz. ISBN 978-3-320-02130-6. OCLC 269406597.
- Hochmuth, Ursel; Meyer, Gertrud (1980). Streiflichter aus dem Hamburger Widerstand : 1933-1945 [Streiflichter from the Hamburg Resistance : 1933-1945]. Bibliothek des Widerstandes (in German). Frankfurt: Röderberg-Verl. pp. 341–386. ISBN 9783876820361. OCLC 633634339.
- Siegfried, Mielke; Heinz, Stefan (2017). Eisenbahngewerkschafter im NS-Staat : Verfolgung - Widerstand - Emigration (1933-1945) [Railway unionists in the Nazi state. Persecution - Resistance - Emigration (1933-1945)]. Gewerkschafter im Nationalsozialismus (in German). Vol. 7. Berlin: Metropol-Verlag. ISBN 9783863313531. OCLC 1015203638.
- Luise Kraushaar; Klaus Drobisch; Gertrud Glondajewski; Hans Dress; Institut für Marxismus-Leninismus. Deutsche Widerstandskämpfer 1933-1945 : Biographien und Briefe. Band 2 [German Resistance Fighters 1933-1945 : Biographies and Letters] (in German). Vol. 2. Berlin: Dietz Verlag. pp. 345–347. OCLC 758497937.
