= People of the Saefkow-Jacob-Bästlein Organisation =

List of Saefkow-Jacob-Bästlein Organisation people

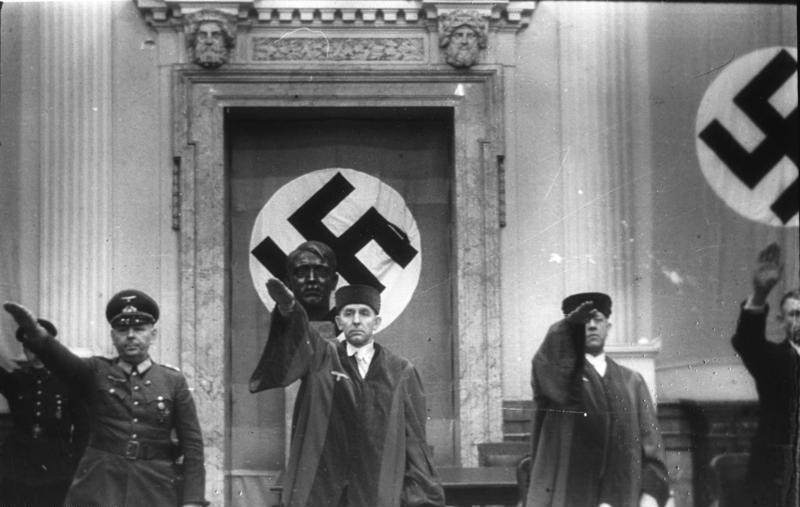
A session at the Volksgerichtshof in 1944. From left: General of the Infantry Hermann Reinecke; Roland Freisler, president of the court; Ernst Lautz, chief public prosecutor

People of the Saefkow-Jacob-Bästlein Organisation is a list of participants, associates and helpers of the Saefkow-Jacob-Bästlein Organization, which was one of the largest anti-Nazi resistance organisations that came into existence during World War II in Germany. It was formed in Berlin and had contacts to many other regions that hosted industrial manufacturing. It is therefore also referred to in the literature as the operational leadership of the Communist Party of Germany (KPD). However, it was not only communists among the groups of the Saefkov Jacob Bästlein organisation. The 506 people in the resistance organisation included about 200 before 1933 who were KPD members, 22 to the Social Democratic Party of Germany (SPD) or to the Socialist Workers' Party of Germany (SAP) and around 200 were non-party; one in four was a woman. 160 men and women were unionised before 1933, more than 60 of them in the German Metal Workers' Union (DMV).

== A ==
Name	Life	Employment	Position	Arrested	Fate	Notes
Hans Ackermann		Retired civil servant	Argus.			Hid Max Krakauer and his wife in tents, helped to procure identity cards and gave shelter to two other Jewish women.
Paul Albrecht		toolmaker	Kärger AG			Worked with the toolmaker August Ditzell, labourer Herbert Hirl, and the locksmiths Bruno Lauermann and Otto Rosentreter to resist in the 600 person company.
Bernhard Almstadt	(1897–1944)	Managing director of the Arbeiter-Sport-Verlag, KPD member		12 July 1944 and sentenced to death on the 19th	Executed on 6 November 1944 in the Brandenburg-Görden penitentiary	Courier, participated in the dissemination of the illegal paper, Die Innere Front (The Inner Front).
Judith Auer	(1905–1944)	Stenographer, KPD member	Kabelwerk Oberspree	Arrested 7 July 1944	Executed in October 1944 in Plötzensee Prison by hanging	Worked with Fritz Plön to organise resistance. Eventually managed the Saefkow-Jacob-Bästlein group finances and acted as a courier while on company business trips.

== B ==
Name	Life	Employment	Position	Arrested	Fate	Notes
Ellie Bänsch	(1909–1974)	Seamstress			4 December 1944, sentenced to five years in prison for "aid to preparation for high treason". Survived the war	Wife of Willhelm Bänsch.
Marth Bänsch	(1912-?)	Housewife, KVJD member			4 December 1944, sentenced to five years in prison for "aid to preparation for high treason"	Sister of Willi Bänsch.
Willhelm Bänsch	(1908–1944)	Locksmith, KJVD member		Arrested 12 November 1944, sentenced to death in December 1944	Executed in Brandenburg-Görden prison on 11 December 1944	Worked with the KPD to distribute illegal leaflets.
Bernhard Bästlein	(1894–1944)	Precision mechanic, KPD member		Arrested 30 May 1944 and sentenced to death on 5 September 1944 for "preparation for high treason, enemy favour and defence decomposition"	Executed on 18 September 1944 at Brandenburg-Görden Prison.	Organiser of the Bästlein-Jacob-Abshagen Group.
Karl Baier	(1887–1973)	Carpenter, later politician. SAPD member		Arrested on 22 August 1933	Sentenced on 5 December 1934 to 2 1/2 years in prison by the 2nd senate of the Volksgerichtshof.	Organised the exchange of information, the collection of money and food stamps for Nazi opponents and Jewish families.
Julius Balkow	(1909–1973)	Mechanical engineer	Siemens	Arrested on 20 In July 1944 by the Gestapo	Sentenced to 7 years in prison by the Volksgerichtshof "for the reason of favour and preparation for high treason". Liberated by the Red Army in April 1945.	He was active there in the group leadership and passed on money and food stamps to Saefkow.
Paul Bartsch	(1885-?)	Lathe operator, KPD member		Arrested 9 August 1944	Sentenced to three years in prison for paying Red Aid contributions.	Carried out courier services to procure money and food stamps.
Walter Basalay		Gardener			Sentenced to two years in prison	
Gustav Basse	(1894–1944)	Fitter, engineer. KPD member	Nicolaus & Co	Arrested 16 July 1944	In September 1944 sentenced to death by the Volksgerichtshof. Executed in Brandenburg-Görden prison on 6 November 1944.	Supplied underground communist newspapers and other publications to resistance members.
Reinhard Baum	(1902-?)	Mechanic and technician	FA. Bosse		Sentenced to five years in prison.	
Richard Bergow		Plasterer and manager	Askania	Arrested on 12 July 1944 and sentenced to death by the Volksgerichtshof	Survived pre-trial detention by being liberated on 14 April 1945	One of the three-man leadership team in Askania along with Paul Junius and Paul Hirsch. Ran the 60 member resistance group in the factory.
Ernst Beuthke	(1903–1943)	Warehouse man, KPD member, Soviet parachutist.	Siemens	Arrested with his wife after returning from the USSR and exposing himself in the Little Moscow garden colony.	Shot without trial in Sachsenhausen concentration camp	Killed by what the Nazis called Sippenhaft, whereby they were inclined to kill the whole family in revenge whenever a Red Orchestra member was discovered. Shot without trial.
Charlotte Bischoff	(1901–1944)	Stenographer, KPD member			Survived the war	Participated in the dissemination of the illegal paper, Die Innere Front. SED functionary.
Margarete Blank	(1901–1945)	Leipzig, doctor		Arrested 14 July 1944 as a "Bolshevik spy and agent"	6th Senate of the Volksgerichtshof sentenced Blank to death on 15 December 1944. Executed in the courtyard of the court.	Looked after the children of arrested anti-fascists. Linked to the resistance group of Alfred Frank in 1935, but not active as a resistance fighter. Enunciated doubts about the final victory and a colleague informed on her, leading to her arrest.
Willi Bolien	(1907–1944)	Plumber, KPD member	Hans Windhoff Apparate- und Maschinenfabrik AG	Arrested on 13 October 1944	Died on 14 October 1944 by jumping out a window of Gestapo headquarters	Established a resistance group at the factory and supplied underground publications and pamphlets to the factory.
Max Borrack	(1901–1945)	Commercial representative for wine company. SPD member		Arrested in April 1944. Sentenced to death for "preparation for high treason in difficult form"	On the 19 February 1945, he was executed in Brandenburg-Görden Prison	Belonged to group around Paul Hinze.
Marta Borrack					Sentenced to two years in prison for not reporting whereabouts of Paul Hinze.	Wife of Max Borrack
Wilhelm Bösch	(1897–1945)	Machine fitter	AEG Turbine in Moabit	Arrested April 1945	Sentenced to death for "decomposition of military strength" and "preparation for high treason". Executed in Plötzensee Prison on 6 April 1945	Member of resistance group in the AEG factory. Worked with Richard Klotzbücher to undermine factory production.
Bruno Braun	(1901–1990)		Daimler-Benz AG	Arrested in September 1944	Remained in custody until the end of the war	In a resistance cell with Paul Klimmek and Robert Uhrig. Worked to undermine the factory.
Hermann Bruse	(1904–1953)	Painter and graphic artist. KPD member		First arrested 1934, released 1937. Arrested again in 1944	Survived the war due to the advancing Allied army.	Member of the Rote Hilfe group, later the Danz-Schwantes Group. Created illustrations and drawings for the underground communist KPD newspaper Tribüne.
Richard Budach	(1901-?)	Lathe operator, KPD member	AEG Wildau		Sentenced to 4 years in prison	
Gustav Boguslawski	(1895–1971)	Locksmith. KPD member	FA. Ludwig Loewe		Survived the war	Distributed leaflets and underground KPD publications to factory workers.

== C ==
Name	Life	Employment	Position	Arrested	Fate	Notes
Martha von Ceminski	(1905–1978)	Workshop clerk, KPD member and liaison	Askania	Arrested 11 July 1944	Sent to Ravensbrück concentration camp and liberated 1 May 1945 by the Red Army	Ceminski was a workshop clerk that enabled her to speak to may different groups in the Askania factory. When they began to resist, she established the connection to the KPD. Her fiancé Rudi Grosse was killed by the Gestapo, in a supposed accident.
Gerhard Churfürst		Painter and draughtsman	Alkett Altmärkisches Kettenwerk			Supported Jewish communities with money, food and identity papers.

== D ==
Name	Life	Employment	Position	Arrested	Fate	Notes
Hermann Danz	(1906–1945)	Blacksmith, KPD member, Comintern agent		Arrested on 9 July 1944.	Sentenced to death in November 1944 by the Volksgerichtshof. Executed at Brandenburg-Görden Prison on 5 February 1944	KPD organiser in Magdeburg.
Erich Dawideit	(1909-1945)	Metal worker	Siemens Dynamo plant, later Argus engine company	Arrested in 1938 and sentenced three and half years prison due to "mass propaganda".	In 1943, drafted into 999th Light Afrika Division (Wehrmacht) penal battalion. In 1945 was captured and died in Veles under unclear circumstances	Worked with an illegal group in the Siemens plant. He collected money and food for the resistance. One of the most active organisers in the group.
Werner Deckers	(1913–1993)	Sales representative and later soldier		Arrested on 17 July 1944. Sentenced to 7 years in prison due to his association with the Saefkow group	Survived the war when on 27 April 27, 1945 was liberated by the Red Army in the prison in Potsdam.	Working-class professional athlete who turned to resistance. Collected money and food for illegal immigrants and distributed leaflets with his sister Helene.
Walter Demant	(1900–?)	KPD member. Instructor at Red Aid before 1933	Argus Motoren where he led interventions to sabotage products			Red Aid Communist instructor in agitprop. At Argus worked along with his fellow collaborators to paralyse war production.
Franz Demuth	(1895–1971)	Editor, KPD member and secretary	Hamburger Volkszeitung, later		March to April 1933 in Sonnenburg concentration camp. Survived the war	Communist activist who resisted with Georg Dünninghaus, Jakob Schlör, Willi Schönbeck, Albert Almstedt, Otto Marquardt and Karl Baier.
Arthur Deutschmann		NKFD member	Daimler-Benz AG			Ran a propaganda campaign along with Bruno Braun.
Georg Dimentstein	(1897-1945)	Fine artist and commercial artist	Bruns & Stauff GmbH, United Graphische Kunstanstalten.	Arrested on 17 August 1944. As he was Jewish, he was sent straight to a concentration camp	6 January 1945 shot dead in Sachsenhausen concentration camp	Worked with the engineer Hugo Kapteina and Hans Lippmann, Arthur Grimmer, Reinhold Hermann.
August Ditzell		Toolmaker	Kärger AG, KPD member			
Heinz Dohrenberg	(1910-?)	Appointment clerk			Sentenced to 10 years in prison	
Rudolf Drabinski	(1919-?)	Industrial clerk, later drafted	Müller Gummiwaren AG			Helped to improve the lives of Soviet and French forced labourers at Müller Gummiwaren AG. Later drafted into the Wehrmacht, but was then able to provide security to his former resistance cell, as he was in uniform.
Arthur Drelse	(1896–?)	Lathe operator				
Alfred Drüsener	(?–1943)	Part of a group of thirty people who resisted	Siemens Plania.			Part of a group led by Fritz Goll, who collected money, food and food stamps for forced labourers who worked in Siemens.
Heinz Drzymala	(1918–1944)	Toolmaker, KPD Member	Alfred Teves	Arrested on 10 August 1944	Sentenced to death on 10 October 1944 by the Volksgerichtshof. Executed on 27. November 1944 at Brandenburg-Görden prison	He distributed leaflets and collected money and food for those living illegally. Established a cell in the Alfred Teves factory. Worked as the liaison to the organisation. However, when a list of donations he kept in small book was discovered by the Gestapo, he was arrested.

== E ==
Name	Life	Employment	Position	Arrested	Fate	Notes
Max Eckert			Knorr-Bremse			Worked with Ernst Klein, Jahn Masek, Gustav Schlaupitz, Richard Weißensteiner as well as Fritz Giersch but could do little in the large factory.
Peter Paul Eickmeier	(1890–1962)	Commercial artist and political cartoonist, KPD member	Deutsche Volkszeitung, Berliner Zeitung, Neues Deutschland newspapers	Arrested multiple times	Survived the war	Co-publisher of the semi-legal newspaper "Welt und Leben" (World and Life) and the illegal newspaper "Der Maulwurf" (The mole). After the war Eickmeier had a successful career in a number of East German newspapers as a press draughtsmen.
Fritz Emrich	(1894–1947)	Bricklayer, Politician, KPD member	Schneider		Survived the war	KPD functionary. Originally the Reichsleiter of the Revolutionären Gewerkschafts-Opposition in 1930, later KPD politician. Arrested in 1933 as a communist until 1936. Worked with the KPD during the interwar period and when the war started, became a resistance fighter when he joined forces with the group associated with Anton Saefkow.
Hertha Engel						
Otto Engert	(1895–1945)	Carpenter, Politician, KPD member		Arrested July 1944	Sentenced to death and executed on 11 January 1945 in the courtyard in Dresden Regional Court	In the early-to-mid 1930s worked with Georg Schumann and Kurt Kresse. During the war worked with Theodor Neubauer and Magnus Poser. Later during the war wrote leaflets calling for the end of the Nazi regime.
Helene Ettig		Housewife			Survived the war	Made her apartment available for illegal meetings and fugitives.

== F ==
Name	Life	Employment	Position	Arrested	Fate	Notes
Erich Fähling	(1899–1981)	Printer, SAP member, instructor	Bertinetti	Went into hiding when the arrests of the group started	Survived the war	Worked as a Socialist Workers' Party of Germany functionary.
Theodor Feuerherdt	(1893–1970)	Fitter, KPD member	Askania	Arrested in 1944	Sentenced to three years for paying contributions to International Red Aid. Survived the war	Contacted the SPD while working in the Askania factories but no resistance formed so contacted KPD. Worked to carry out acts of sabotage in every form, distributing illegal leaflets, establishing contacts with like-minded people and to organise collections for the surviving dependents of political prisoners.
Margarethe Fischer	(1910–1999)	KPD member		Arrested on 15 November 1934	Sent to Moringen concentration camp Survived the war	Margarete Fischer was the organiser of the residential party cell "Ebert-Siedlung" in the western part of the district. She worked illegally with August Creutzburg, a former Reichstag deputy, and was imprisoned in March 1934 along with her family due to the Schwalbach group's activities. She was released at the end of the year due to the Hindenburg amnesty.
Hans Fischer			Askania			In a resistance cell at Askania with Paul Hirsch, Giemens Seifert, Karl Lade, Kurt Rühlmann and Walter Zimmermann.
Margarete Fischer	(1906-1983)	KPD member		Arrested by the Gestapo on 15 November 1944 and charged with high treason	Imprisoned in Bayreuth prison. Survived the war	Wrote a number of underground pamphlets and newspapers that she distributed to soldiers. Worked in an KPD cell through Richard Wenzel and Fritz Emrich.
Herbert Förster						
Siegfried Forstreuter	(1914–1944)	Turner	Zahnradfabrik Friedrich Stolzenberg & Co.	Arrested in July 1944	On 30 October 1944, Forstreuter was executed in Brandenburg penitentiary	Supplied into the Heereszeugamt. Part of a resistance cell with Karl Lüdtke, Harry Harder and Waldemar Hentze and Max Sauer who was the main contact with Saefkow.
Alfred Frank	(1884–1945)	Artist and graphic artist. KPD member		Arrested on 19 July 1944	Executed in the courtyard of Dresden regional court on 12 January 1945.	In 1935/36, together with other intellectuals such as Margarete Blank, Wolfgang Heinze and Georg Sacke, he founded a resistance group that joined the Schumann-Engert-Kresse group around Georg Schumann, Georg Schumann, Otto Engert and Kurt Kresse at the beginning of World War II. Created and produced linocuts, pamphlets, leaflets and posters for the KPD
Erwin Freyer	(1914–1992)	Engineer, Major-General of the NPA	Henschel	Arrested 15 July 1944 along with Hedwig Hartung	Sentenced to death in September 1944 for "aiding the enemy". Escaped execution due to his expertise in remote-controlled bombs. Released in April 1945.	Held meetings with Erwin Freyer and the "National Committee for a Free Germany" movement.
Karl Fübinger	(1900–1945)	Mechanical engineer	The Teves machinery and valves factory	Arrested on 17 August 1942	Sentenced to death on 14 December 1944 by the Volksgerichtshof Executed in Brandenburg-Görden Prison.	Established a resistance group at the factory where he arranged six cells with about forty member. They made contact in Saefkow in 1941.

== G ==
Name	Life	Employment	Position	Arrested	Fate	Notes
Fritz Giersch	(1915–1981)	Locksmith, KPD member	Knorr-Bremse		Sent to a penal battalion. Survived the war. Later worked for the German Economic Commission and in a government ministry of the GDR	Worked with Max Eckert, Ernst Klein, Jahn Masek, Gustav Schlaupitz, Richard Weißensteiner. Resistance efforts had little real effect.
Werner Goethert		KPD member	Hasse & Wrede			Established 10 resistance cells of three people each by 1944.
Otto Gohlke	(1886–1945)	Bricklayer, KPD member	Allemeine Werkzeugmaschinen AG			Part of a group along with Bernhard Jeschkeit and Erdmann Meyer.
Fritz Goll	(1897–1985)	Tailor, KPD member	Siemens-Plania		Survived the war	Group leader of resistance network in the factory. Main liaison to the Saefkow organization. Distributed underground pamphlets among trusted colleagues.
Fritz Goltz	(1914–1984)		Schneider, Argus (Reinickendorf).		Survived the war	Worked as the leader in the operational area of the north and east of the Berlin. Group organiser.
Max Grabowski	(1897–1981)	Painter and graphic designer, KPD member			Survived the war	Printed the Die Innere Front leaflet in his paint store.
Otto Grabowski	(1892–1961)	Locksmith and later sculptor. KPD member, Red Aid member			Survived the war	Worked with the Red Aid until 1934. Linked to John Sieg and helped to produce the Die Innere Front magazine. Drafted into the Wehrmacht in 1944.
Otto Grabowski	(1901–1944)	Turner, KPD member	Berliner Maschinenbau AG, before. L. Schwartzkopff (BMAG) in Wildau	Arrested on 21 May 1943 and sentenced to death on 30 March 1944 by the Volksgerichtshof	Executed on 10 July 1944 in Brandenburg-Görden Prison	Worked with Werner Gusche, Wilhelm Jakobs, Otto Lemm, Karl Scherer, Paul Schulze (1898–1944) and Paul Schütze (1891- 1944) in a resistance cell in the factories at Niederlehmer.
Otto Gresch		Model carpenter		Arrested in July 1944	Sentenced to 12 years in prison. Liberated in April 1945 and survived the war	Worked as a courier distributing underground leaflets and posters. Worked with Herbert Fölster and Helmut Wagner.
Artur Grimmer	(1906-1982)	Painter, graphic artist	Alkett.		Survived the war	Collaborated with Georg Dimentstein, Reinhold Hermann, Hugo Kapteina, Willi Heinze to establish a resistance cell in Alkett.
Grete Groh-Kummerlöw	(1909–1980)	Textile worker, KVJD member, KPD member, later politician		Arrested on 10 August 1944 in connection with the 20 July plot	Charged with "preparation for high treason". Was to stand trial but liberated on 27 April 1945 by the Red Army.	Through Kurt Sindermann, made contact with the organisation around Anton Saefkow.
Richard Grubitz	(1914–2005)	Bookbinder, resistance fighter			Survived the war	Contacted the organisation through Hans Paucka. Worked with Saefkow on several operations and hid several resistance fighters at his home.
Melchior Gruda	(1886–1945)	Baker later pipe-layer		Arrested in August 1944. Sentenced in the SS Court Main Office in Munich.	Released in April 1945 along with all other political prisoners. Died on 30 April 1945 during fighting in Prenzlauer Berg	Sergeant of the air protection police in the Prenzlauer Berg section command. Started to resist in autumn 1944. Worked closely with Helmut Wagner from the military-political branch of the Saefkow organization

== H ==
Name	Life	Employment	Position	Arrested	Fate	Notes
Auguste Haase	(1899–1945)	Domestic worker	Bergmann.	Arrested 3 August 1944 by the Gestapo.	Sentenced to death. Executed at Barnimstraße Women's Prison in December 1944	Head of the companies forced labour camp. Supported Soviet and French forced labourers in the camp.
Bruno Hämmerling	(1896–1944)	Plumber, KPD functionary		Arrested on 6 July 1944 and	Sentenced to death by the Volksgerichtshof on 31 August 1944. Executed on executed 30 October 1944.	Sentenced on the same day as Judith Auer and Franz Schmidt.
Harry Harder	(1904–1944)		Stolzenberg factory in Berlin		Executed 4 November 1944	Worked with Karl Lüdtke and Waldemar Hentze and Max Sauer.
Otto Hartmann			Siemens Plania			Part of a group of resistance fighters at Siemens, led by Fritz Goll.
Hedwig Hartung	(1914–1945)	Nursery teacher, resistance fighter		Arrested 15 July 1944	Acquitted on 18 September 1944 by the Volksgerichtshof. Sent to a concentration camp but released in December 1944 due to life-threatening illness. Succumbed to heart failure in February 1945 due to her imprisonment.	SPD and SAP member. Part of a resistance group associated with Elisabeth Schumacher. Later formed a resistance cell while working in the propaganda department of the OKW along with Heinrich Werner.
Auguste Hegenbarth						Wife of Paul Hegenbarth. Worked with her husband to glue anti-fascist slogans on the Jannowitz Bridge
Paul Hegenbart	(1884–1945)	Upholsterer and saddler, KPD member		Arrested on 17 August 1944	Sentenced to death on 18 January 1945 and executed on 26 February 1946	KPD instructor in Agitprop in the district of Berlin. Worked with Wilhelm Heinze and Julius Wordelmann. Donated money and food to resistance fighter in hiding. Distributed leaflets.
Willi Heinze	(1910–1945)	Tailor, KPD functionary		Arrested in August 1944	On 18 January 194 sentenced to death by the Volksgerichtshof.	Distributed pamphlets. Worked with Robert Uhrig and Wilhelm Selke. Liaised with the Saefkow organisation.
Wolfgang Heinze	(1911–1945)	Lawyer	Köllmann Werkzeugfabrik GmbH	Arrested in August 1944. Sentenced to death on 12 August 1944	Executed in January 1945 in the courtyard of Dresden Regional Court.	Worked with Alfred Frank to resist the Nazis. In Leipzig, he was involved in the publication of an illegal newspaper. For the forced labourers employed in the company of the Köllmann-Werke, he organised food, clothing and medicines and tried to disrupt the production of parts of the armour there.
Waldemar Hentze	(1902–1945)	KPD member	Friedrich Stolzenberg & Co	Arrested on 11 July 1944	On 14 December 1944 the 1st senate of the Volksgerichtshof to three years in prison.	Worked in a resistance cell at the factory along with Max Sauer and Siegfried Forstreuter.
Reinhold Hermann	(1885–1945)	Printer and trade unionist, SPD member.		Arrested 24 July 1944.	He was charged with "preparation for high treason". Died in Creussen prison subcamp due to injuries caused while travelling	Held illegal meetings in his apartment and made pamphlets with other members of the resistance group who lived in the same area.
Willy Hielscher	(1904–1945)	Saddler and tailor	Bergmann-Werke	In September 1944 he was arrested	Sentence to death in November 1944	With his wife Helene, he belonged to a political circle of former Fichte athletes in the north of Berlin. Among the group were Caesar Horn, Erwin Reisler, Werner Deckers, Erich Dawideit and Fritz Goltz. Supplied labourers in the Bergmann-Werke with extra food rations. Worked with Arthur Magnor to organise the escape of Georgi Vasilyev.
Gerhard Hildebrandt						
Paul Hinze	(1906–1945)	Butcher, KPD member		Arrested 14 April 1944	Sentenced to death on 15 February 1945 by the Volksgerichtshof. On 20 April 1945 he was executed in Brandenburg-Görden Prison	Was in contact with Werner Seelenbinder and through him Robert Uhrig. Provided food for illegal immigrants, especially Alfred Kowalke. He also procured hiding places for printing and stripping apparatus.
Herbert Hirl		Labourer	Kärger AG			Was part of a resistance cell at Kärger that included toolmakers Paul Albrecht and August Ditzell as well as locksmiths Bruno Lauermann and Otto Rosentreter.
Paul Hirsch	(1907–1945)	Toolmaker, KPD member	Askania AG	Arrested in July 1944. Subject to enhanced interrogation.	Escape on a transport in Potsdam	Organiser of the KPD in Askiana factory. Worked with Karl Lade, Kurt Rühlmann, Stanislaus Szczygielski, Walter Zimmermann and Paul Junius.
Georg Hirschberg		Doctor				Hirschberg lost his stepfather through Nazi persecution. Worked with Richard Grubitz to obtain weapons but the mission failed.
Martin Hirschberg			Siemens-Plania	Arrested and initially sentenced to death	Sentence was commuted to life in prison.	Worked with Fritz Goll, Alfred Drüsener, Ernst Reinke, Paul Lerm, Paul Klemke, Hermann Stahlberg and Otto Hartmann.
Adolf Hofmann						
Josef Höhn	(1902–1945)	Master carpenter, KPD member	Siemens Apparatuses and Machines Ltd.	On the 21 July 1944 Höhn was arrested	Sentenced to death in December 1944 by the Volksgerichtshof for "preparation for high treason"	Helped forced labourers by providing food and practiced sabotage at the factory complex.
Arthur Hoffmann	(1900–1945)	Carpenter, KPD member		Arrested in July 1944	Sentenced by the Volksgerichtshof 22–23 November 1944 to death for undermining the fighting forces and high treason. Executed in the execution yard of Münchner Platz in Leipzig.	One of the organisers of the anti-fascist resistance in Leipzig around Georg Schumann as part of the so-called Schumann-Engert-Kresse group.
Walter Homann	(1906–1945)	Locksmith, KPD member	AEG-Turbinenfabrik	Arrested 13 February 1945.	Sentenced to death by the Berlin Court of Appeal in March 1945. Executed 10 April 1945 at Plötzensee Prison.	Joined the company resistance cell at AEG in 1935. Collected monies for resistance fighters who were imprisoned.
Cäsar Horn	(1914–1945)	Clerk, KPD member		Arrested on 19 July 1944	Tried on 23 January 1945 at the Volksgerichtshof and sentenced to death. Executed by guillotine on 19 March 1945 in Brandenburg-Görden Prison	Joined the Saefkow-Jacob-Bästlein Organization in 1943. Active in the publication of an illegal newspaper, "Der Scheinwerfer".
Erwin Hübenthal	(1901–1993)	Fitter	Kärger AG		Survived the war	Ran a resistance cell at Kärger AG that included six people. Acted as the main liaison to the Saefkow group. Hübenthal provided much of the research on what it was like to be a resistance fighter in a factory of 600 people, at Kärger AG.
Richard Hützel Huwe	(1894-?)	KPD member	Kabelwerk			

== I ==
Name	Life	Employment	Position	Arrested	Fate	Notes
August Imhof	(1876-?)	Pensioner. Former trade union official				

== J ==
Name	Life	Employment	Position	Arrested	Fate	Notes
Franz Jacob	(1906–1944)	Machinist, KPD member		Jacob was arrested on 4 July 1944	On 5 September 1944 he was sentenced to death by the Volksgerichtshof. He executed on 18 September 1944 at Brandenburg-Görden Prison.	Worked with his friends Bernhard Bästlein and Robert Abshagen to form the Bästlein-Jacob-Abshagen communist resistance group.
Herbert Jacobi		Entrepreneur and welder, KPD member	Primus-Traktoren			Part of a resistance cell with Hans Ackermann, Erwin Reisler, and Alois Wiesen at Argus.
Max Jacoby	(1890-?)	Machine setter	Ludwig Loewe			Worked alongside Friedrich Klemstein and Erich Janke along with 40 other communists who actively resisted at the Ludwig Loewe factory.
Otto Jahn	(1910-?)	Painter	Hasse & Wrede in Marzahn			Provided food for Russian slave labour locked in the factory at night. Also sabotaged the development of machine that made grenades.
Alfred Janitzky	(1904–1969)	Machinist	AEG Turbine in Moabit			
Erich Janke	(1901–1982)	Lathe operator	Ludwig Loewe			Worked with Friedrich Klemstein and Max Jacoby along with 40 other colleague as part of group of communists at the FA. Ludwig Loewe factory, that worked to oppose the Nazis.
Hans Jendretzky	(1897–1992)	Locksmith, KPD member		Arrested in August 1944	On 10 October 1944, he was sentenced to three years in prison by the Volksgerichtshof. Sent to Brandenburg prison.	Leading KPD functionary. Member of the main resistance committee of the Saefkow resistance group.
Bernhard Jeschkeit			Allemeine Werkzeugmaschinen AG			Distributed illegal communist leaflets in the company. Collaborated with Erdmann Meyer and Otto Gohlke.
Wilhelm Jungmittag	(1908–1944)	Typesetter, later photographer. KPD member	Bamag-Meguin	Arrested 5 July 1944	Sentenced to death on 7 September. Executed in Brandenburgh Prison on 20 November 1944	Hid Bernhard Bästlein in his apartment in 1944.
Paul Junius	(1901–1944)	Machinist	Askania Werke	Arrested on 13 July 1944.	In November 1944 he was sentenced to death. Executed at Brandenburg-Görden penitentiary in December 1944.	Part of a resistance cell run by Paul Hirsch that included Erwin Kerber, Theodor Feuerherdt and Max Klamm. Ran the KPD group at Askania. Promoted the Free Germany movement as well as organising sabotage to production, distributed illegal pamphlets and collected food stamps and money for illegal immigrants.
Werner Jurr	(1904–1947)	Plumber, technical employee, former KPD member	Rote Hilfe instructor	Arrested on 20 July 1944	Sentenced by the Volksgerichtshof to 7 years in Brandenburg penitentiary. Freed in April 1945 due to illness. Died of cancer in 1947	Distributed communist materials from the National Committee for a Free Germany received from his collaborator, Erna Senkel.

== K ==
Name	Life	Employment	Position	Arrested	Fate	Notes
Alfred Kafka	(1906-?)	Saddler	Ambi-Budd	Appeared in court along with his wife on 25 April 1945		Gerda Kafka was his wife. Director of Red Aid in Berlin. Worked with Walter König, Arno Kresse, Siegfried Flade, Hans Barnick and Ella Seibt in a resistance cell.
Gerda Kafka	(1920–1945)	Saleswomen			Disappeared. Likely died in a fire. Declared dead on 22 April 1945	Hid Gerhard Pergamenter and Josef Karb in her apartment when they escaped from custody. Provided food to slave labourers and worked as a courier for her husband.
Hugo Kapteina	(1903–1945)	Designer, draughtsman, SPD member	Alkett Altmärkisches Kettenwerk	Arrested on 15 February 1945. Sentenced to death for "preparation for high treason" and "fruitfulness of encasion"	On 20 April 1945 he was executed by guillotine at Brandenburg-Görden Prison	Kapteina built a resistance cell at Alkett that sabotaged vehicle production as well as distributing leaflets from the Saefkow organisation.
Bernhard Karl	(1916–1977)	KPD member	Ambi-Budd		Survived the war	Worked with Alfred Kafka in collecting money and painting anti-war slogans. He made his apartment available for forbidden meetings.
Karl Kasten	(1909–1981)	KPD organisational leader			Survived the war	
Gustav Kaufmann						
Gerhard Kaun	(1911–1944)	Commercial clerk, KPD member		Arrested on 26 July 1944	Executed on 4 December 1944 at Brandenburg-Görden prison.	Conscripted with the rank of corporal and worked at the Wehrmacht equipment stores. Procured weapons and equipment for the group.
Erwin Kerber	(1911–1981)	Designer, KPD member				Spent most of the 1930s to almost end of war in jail. Joined resistance at the very end of war.
Hans Kiefert	(1905–1966)	Carpenter, later Politician. KPD member	Mitropa		Survived the war	KPD functionary.
Helene Kirsch	(1906–1966)	Politician. KPD member			Survived the war	Women's leader of the KPD in the district of Wedding in Berlin.
Max Klamm	(1898–)	Engineer, trade unionist	Askania-Werk	Arrested in 1944	Sentenced to 8 years in prison. Survived the war.	KPO member.
Paul Klemke						
Friedrich Klemstein	(1893–1945)	Trade unionist, KPD member	Ludwig Loewe & Co	Arrested on 18 September 1944	On 2 February 1945 he was sentenced by Volksgerichtshof to death. Executed in April 1945	Member of Red Aid. Established a cell in the Loewe factory. Distributed leaflets and collected monies for political prisoners
Paul Klimmek	(1899–1949)	Pipe fitter, KPD member	Daimler-Benz AG	Arrested on 19 September 1944	Sentenced to death for preparation for high treason. Liberated on 14 April 1945	Part of a three-man resistance cell at Daimler-Benz that included Bruno Braun and Robert Uhrig.
Kurt Klinke	(1910–1944)	Mechanic	Siemans	Arrested on 13 December 1944	Died from wounds received from torture	Disrupted production in the Sieman's factory.
Karl Klodt						
Richard Klotzbücher	(1904–1945)	Unskilled labour. Later worked in human resources	AEG Turbine	Arrested on 22 February 1945	Sentenced to death for preparation of treason. Executed on 10 April 1945 in Plötzensee prison	Worked with Wilhelm Leist and Wilhelm Bösch to form a resistance cell at AEG Turbine.
Otto Klubach	(1899-?)	Factory electrician, KPD member	Teves			Worked with Walter Kleist and others, and later Eva Tenner, Walter Pahl, Peter Strotzyk, along with Peter Strotzyk, Karl Venus and Willi Jahn in forming a communist resistance cell at Teves.
Hans Kniffert		KPD member	Siemens-Schaltwerk			
Wilhelm Knop						
Paul Knorr	(1898–1944)	Lathe operator, KPD member	Siemens AG	Arrested in autumn 1944	Hanged himself 16 September 1944 out of fear of further hanging	
Willy Kolbe	(1901–1945)	Locksmith and mechanical engineer	Ludwig Loewe & Co	Arrested on 28 September 1944 and taken to Plötzensee Prison	Sentenced to three years in prison for "preparing to commit high treason". Died on an evacuation march.	Part of a resistance cell at Ludwig Loewe & Co.
Hermann Köppen	(1901-?)					
Kurt Kresse	(1904–1945)	Miner, later book printer. KPD member		On 19 June 1944, Kresse was arrested for a second time.	Sentenced to death on 21 November 1944 and executed on 11 January 1945	Worked with Georg Schumann to establish the KPD in Leipzig. Worked to sabotage war production.
Johannes Kreiselmaier	(1892–1944)	Gynecologist		Arrested 8 July 1944	Executed on 27 November 1944 in prison Brandenburg-Görden penitentiary	Treated prisoners and forced foreign labourers the same as native German patients. Donated money and provided medical help for forced laborers and fellow members of the group who had gone into hiding.
Otto Kroeger	(1910–1945)	Setter	Alfred Teves	Arrested in August 1944	Sentenced to death on 14 December 1944 and executed at Brandenburg-Görden prison on 29 January 1945	Helped to establish a resistance organisation at the factory and participated in the spread of illegal pamphlets and political anti-war propaganda.
Kurt Kujawicki	(1913–1991)	Machinist	Askania			
Wolfgang Kühn		Physician				Provided free medical support to slave labour. Supplied intelligence about the V-2 rocket collected from his Nazi patients.
Walter Kühne	(1911–?)	Blacksmith				

== L ==
Name	Life	Employment	Position	Arrested	Fate	Notes
Karl Ladé	(1909–1945)	Design engineer	Askania-Werke in Berlin-Mariendorf	Arrested on 12 July 1944 as part of a mass arrest as Askania.	One 29 November 1933, the Volksgerichtshof sentenced him together with Kurt Rühlmann, Stanislaus Szczygielski and Walter Zimmermann to death by guillotine. The sentence was carried out in Brandenburg-Görden prison on 8 January 1945.	Ladé resisted by disrupting armaments production, distributing leaflets, collecting money to support anti-fascists and procured food for illegal immigrants.
Otto Lang	(1890–1945)	Office worker	AEG Turbine (Moabit)		Executed by guillotine.	
Fritz Lange	(1898–1981)	Resistance fighter, later politician, KPD member		On 1 December 1942, he and Martin Weise were arrested	On 8 October 1943 he was convicted in the second Senate of the Reichskrieggericht for "complicity in treason and aiding the enemy" and sentenced to five years of hard labour.	Editor of the left-wing newspaper, Die Innere Front.
Maria Langner	(1901–1967)	Office clerk, Writer			Sentenced to "aiding and abetting desertion and providing information" to the Saefkow group	Provided news for the group.
Herbert Langowski	(1901–1962)		AEG Turbine (Moabit)		Survived the war	
Bruno Lauermann		Locksmith	Kärger AG			Part of a resistance cell at AEG consisting of Paul Albrecht, toolmaker August Ditzell, labourer Herbert Hirl and the locksmith Otto Rosentreter.
Hugo Launicke	(1909–1975)	Construction worker, later politician, KPD member			Survived the war	Spent much of the war in a concentration camp. Worked as a KPD functionary while in jail.
Heinz Lehmann	(1911-1944)	KJVD functionary	Gummiwerke Weißensee	Denounced for stating "If this continues, the Russians will soon be in Berlin" and arrested on 15 May 1944	Released for lack of evidence but the Gestapo sent him to a subcamp of Flossenbürg concentration camp, where he was shot by the SS in April 1945	Helped Soviet and French forced labourers and led an illegal KPD group in Karow. Also used his apartment for meetings. When he joined the Saefkow group in 1943, he procured materials for group and distributed leaflets.
Georg Lehnig	(1907–1945)	Mechanic, KPD member	Oberspree, AEG, Rheinmetall-Borsig	Arrested April 1944	Sentenced to death on 11 January 1945. Executed in Brandenburg prison.	Sheltered Paul Hinze who was wanted by the Gestapo in his apartment. Distributed leaflets amongst forced foreign labour.
Georg Leichtmann	(1893–1945)	Locksmith, machinist, KPD member		Arrested on 7 December 1944. Shot while attempting to escape and interned at Ravensbrück concentration camp	On 24 March 1945, he was sentenced to death by the Special Criminal Senate of the Berlin Court of Appeal and executed on 18 April 1945 in the Plötzensee prison	Passed information and documents about the Saefkow-Jacob-Bästlein organization to the Swedish Foreign Ministry.
Wilhelm Leist	(1899–1945)	Lathe operator, KPD member	AEG Turbine (Moabit)		Executed on 10 April 1945 in Plötzensee.	
Otto Lemm	(1895–1944)	Electric engineer, KPD member	Berliner Maschinenbau AG	Arrested in 1942	Sentenced to death on 17 March 1944 and executed on 17 July 1944 at Brandenburg-Görden Prison	Responsible for the physics laboratory at the factory. Collected money, food and food stamps for forced foreign labourers.
Emil Leo						
Paul Lerm	(1909–1989)	Electrical engineer, KPD member	Siemens-Plania		Survived the war	Collected money, food and food stamps for forced foreign labourers. Worked with a group led by Fritz Goll, consisting of Martin Hirschberg, Alfred Drüsener, Ernst Reinke, Paul Klemke, Hermann Stahlberg and Otto Hartmann at Siemens.
Walter Leu	(1908–1944)	Machinist, KPD member			Executed in Moabit prison	
Hans Lippmann	(1907-1944)	Engineer	Siemens & Halske	Arrested on 5 September 1944 and severely beaten by the Gestapo	Lippmann was shot in Sachsenhausen concentration camp without a trial on 24 November 1944	Distributed leaflets from the Free German National Committee calling for the overthrow of Hitler.
Eva Lippold	(1909–1994)	Stenotypist, KPD member		Arrested on 25 July 1935	Sentenced to 9 years in prison by the 2nd senate of the Volksgerichtshof for "arranging highly treasonous activity under aggravated circumstances".	Worked for the KPD before it was banned in the years leading up to the war and then after she was released in 1943.
Karl Lüdtk	(1905–1945)	Typesetter and printer	Stolzenberg	Lüdtke was arrested on 28 July 1944	On 14 December 1943, the First Senate of the People's Court, presided over by District Court Director Martin Stier, sentenced him to death	Part of a resistance cell at Stolzenberg. Also used his apartment to hold illegal meetings.
Walter Lurat						

== M ==
Name	Life	Employment	Position	Arrested	Fate	Notes
Arthur Magnor	(1890–1945)	Locksmith	Bergmann-Borsig AG	Arrested on 30 August 30, 1944, he was accused of a whole series of crimes.	Executed on 22 January 1945 in Brandenburg-Görden Prison	Magnor had participated in a meeting of Saefkow supporters in the spring of 1944 and hosted the main camp of Bergmann-Borsig AG at his home in Bergfelde for an illegal meeting.
Elisabeth Magnor						
Hildegard Margis	(1887–1944)	Teacher, later publisher. Women's activist	Deutsche Verlags-Anstalt, Ullstein Verlag	Arrested on 12 September 1944	Died during Gesapo torture in Barnimstraße women's prison	Passed on information from the German V-weapons programme to the Saefkow organisation
Jahn Masek			Knorr-Bremse			
Hubert Materlik	(1895–1944)	KPD member	Magdeburger Mühle und Zuckerfabrik	Arrested in July 1944	Hanged himself	Worked with Hermann Danz, Johann Schellheimer and Martin Schwantes. His tasks included contacting foreign forced laborers and distributing leaflets.
Ernst Mehlhase	(1891–?)	Welder and driller, KPD member	FA. Ludwig Loewe			Part of a resistance cell run by Friedrich Klemstein.
Harry Menzel						
Herbert Meybaum		KPD member	Askania			Part of a communist cell as Askania
Walter Mickin	(1910–2001)	Architect, KPD member	Reichsleitung der Rotsportle		Survived the war	
Erich Mielke	(1902–1945)	Foreman	FA. Schulze & Schneider			Worked with Erich Fähling. Distributed leaflets in Siemens factory.
August Mikutta	(1893-?)	Packer	Deutscher Verlag		Sentenced to three years in prison	
Franz Moericke	(1885–1956)	Model carpenter and politician, KPD member	AEG Turbine	Arrested 25 July 1944	Sentenced to three years in prison for "preparation for high treason and enemy defeat" and sent to Brandenburg penitentiary.	Member of the central committee of the KPD. Wrote for the Rote Fahne.
Wilhelm Moll	(1900–1944)	Cutter	Siemens & Halske	Arrested on 8 July 1944	Executed 11 August 1944	Used his apartment for illegal meetings.
Karl Müller			AEG Turbine			

== N ==
Name	Life	Employment	Position	Arrested	Fate	Notes
Kurt Nast	(1908-?)	Trade unionist, milling-machine operator	Schwarzkopff			Collaborated with Erwin Reisler. Collected money and clothing for forced foreign labourers and taking steps to sabotage war production at the factory.
Robert Neddermeyer	(1887–1965)	Poultry farmer, later activist and communist politician.		Arrested on 18 July 1944 for being a member of the Anton Saefkow group	On 6 October 1944 he was sentenced to three years in Brandenburg-Görden prison. Survived the war	Editor on the "Socialist Republic" underground communist newspaper in Cologne.
Emil Nehring	(1881–1944)	Locksmith, KPD member	Alfred Teves Maschinen			From 1934 distributed leaflets at the Alfred Teves company. Later attempted to reduce production at the company by created a broad-consensus amongst all the workers to sabotage production.
Theodor Neubauer	(1890–1945)	Sociologist, KPD member		Arrested on 14 July 1944	On 8 January 1945 he was sentenced to death by the Volksgerichtshof for "preparation for high treason and favoring the enemy". On 5 February 1945 he was beheaded in Brandenburg-Görden prison.	Built the communist Neubauer-Poser Group that was in contact to the Saefkow group.
Gertrud Neuhof	(1901–1987)	Shorthand typist, KPD member		On 27 September 1944, she was arrested and sent to Ravensbrück concentration camp	On 28 April 1945, she was forced on a death march towards Schwerin. After the guards escaped, she was liberated by the Red Army on 1 May 1945	Her husband Karl Neuhof was sent to Sachsenhausen concentration camp in October 1943 and, as a resistance fighter of Jewish descent, was shot without trial on 15 November 1943.
Friedrich Nitschke	(1906–1944)	Precision mechanic	Siemens	Arrested on 5 July 1944	On 5 December 1944 he was sentenced to death and was executed in Brandenburg-Görden prison on 24 October 1944	Used his workshop for illegal meetings and for printing of illegal newspapers and leaftlets.
Erwin Nöldner	(1913–1944)	Locksmith, KPD member	FA. Erwin Auert	Arrested by the Gestapo in July 1944	Sentenced to death 19 September 1944. Executed on 6 November 1944 in the Brandenburg-Görden penitentiary	Member of Red Front Fighters' League along with Paul Dumont and Alfred Grün.
Paul Nowak		Assistant fitter	FA. Ludwig Loewe			

== P ==
Name	Life	Employment	Position	Arrested	Fate	Notes
Willi Paarmann		Grinder	AEG Wildau		Executed in Brandenburg prison on 13 November 1944.	Joined the Saefkow in Christmas 1943 and distributed illegal leaflets to companies in the area he worked in.
Walter Pahl						
Johannes Paucka	(1897–1945)	Saddler, KPD member, Red Aid member			Escaped the Gestapo dragnet after his wife was arrested, but died in Berlin in April 1945 during a fight with the SS to save the Schleuse Wernsdorf locks from being blown up. His wife was sent to Ravensbrück concentration camp but was liberated in April 1945.	Distributed monies amongst various resistance people.
Rudolf Peter	(1889–1945)	Bookbinder, German publisher	Deutscher Verlag	On 28 August 1944 he was arrested by the Gestapo	In January 1945 sentenced to 4 years in prison. He died two months later in Brandenburg-Görden Prison	Held secret trade union meetings at his company, received and distributed banned communist publications and worked to recruit further members.
Richard Piepenburg			AEG Turbine (Moabit)			
Franz Pieper	(1904–1945)	Mechanical engineer, KPD member	AEG Turbine (Moabit)	Arrested at the beginning of 1945	Convicted and sentenced to death for "preparation for high treason". Executed on 13 April 1945 in Berlin-Plötzensee prison	Worked with Wilhelm Leist in a resistance cell at AEG Turbine factory.
Martha Plenzdorf	(1906-?)	KPD member	Osram, Askania		Survived the war	Active in a resistance cell at Askania.
Fritz Plön	(1906–1944)	Welder, KPD member	AEG	Arrested by the Gestapo on 4 February 1942	Sentenced to death by the Volksgerichtshof on 7 July 1942. Plön was executed in Brandenburg-Görden prison on 28 August 1944	Leader of a resistance cell that included the communists Judith Auer, Kurt Kuhrig, Willi Mathias and the Social Democrat Carl Klodt.
Waldemar Plotek	(1880–1945)	Labourer	FA. Miner (Wilhelmsruh)		Brandenburg-Görden prison	
Heinz Plüschke	(1897–1954)	Welder				Distributor of the illegal communist leaflet Die Innere Front
Erna Plüschke						Distributor of the illegal communist leaflet Die Innere Front
Erich Pohl	(1886-1945)	Labourer	AEG Turbine (Moabit)	Arrested on 22 February 1945	Sentenced to death on 24 March 1945. Executed on 13 April 1945 in Plötzensee Prison	Resisted with Richard Weller at AEG by providing the use of his telephone, car and typewriter to the resistance cell. Distributed leaflets.
Magnus Poser	(1907–1944)	Carpenter, KPD member		Arrested on 14 July 1944. Tried to flee on 20 July 1944 and was shot.	Taken to Buchenwald concentration camp sick area where he died of his wounds.	Worked with Theodor Neubauer. Formed an illegal publishers in Jena where he published at least five different leaflets by autumn 1943.
Lydia Poser	(1909–1984)	Typist and cashier later politician. KPD member			Survived the war	Wife of Magnus Poser
Erich Prenzlau						
Emil Priemer		Foreman				
Franz Pütz	(?-1944)	Merchant				

== R ==
Name	Life	Employment	Position	Arrested	Fate	Notes
Ernst Reinke	(1891–1943)	Mixer, KPD member	Siemens	Arrested in September 1939	Sent to Sachsenhausen concentration camp then moved to Flossenbürg concentration camp	Established an illegal resistance cell in Siemens.
Erwin Reisler	(1911–1996)		Argus			
Fritz Reuter (politician)	(1911–2000)	Bricklayer, KPD member, Politician		Arrested in December 1940.	Sentenced to three year and six months in prison by the Volksgerichtshof and sent to Sachsenhausen concentration camp where he escaped. Survived the war	Worked as a KPD organiser during the war.
Paul Richter	(1885–1945)	Machine Fitter				
Friedrich Rödel	(1888–1945)	Politician, KPD member		Arrested in July 1944	Sentenced to death on 1 November 1944 by the Volksgerichtshof. Executed in Brandenburg-Görden prison in March 1945 at the same time as Danz, Martin Schwantes and Johann Schellheimer	Collaborated with Hermann Danz and through him the Saefkow group. Resistance member of the
Fritz Rossignol	(1903–1993)	Engineer, KPD member		Arrested in January 1945. He was tried and acquitted	Released along with his wife. Survived the war.	Received illegal documentation from Franz Jacob.
Margarete Rossignol	(1904–?)	KPD member			Survived the war	Wife of Fritz Rossignol, Collaborated with her husband.
Karl Rudolf		Locksmith	Kärger AG			
Otto Rosentreter		Locksmith	Kärger AG			Collaborated in a resistance cell with Paul Albrecht, August Ditzell, Herbert Hirl and the Bruno Lauermann and Otto Rosentreter.
Heinz Rottke	(1904–1944)					
Karl Rudolf		Riveter	Heinkel			
Kurt Rühlmann	(1903–1945)	Locksmith, mechanic, KPD member	Akania	Arrested 28 July 1944 in Friedeberg	Executed on 8 January 1945 in Brandenburg-Görden Prison	Established a resistance cell with Walter Zimmermann, Walter Ziehmann, Karl Lade in Askania.
Kurt Rydlewski	(1907-?)	Toolmaker				

== S ==
=== SA ===
Name	Life	Employment	Position	Arrested	Fate	Notes
Georg Sacke	(1902–1945)	Historian		Arrested 15 August 1944 and sent to Fuhlsbüttel concentration camp	Later sent to Neuengamme concentration camp. In March 1945 he was forced into a death march to Lübeck and died.	Was active in the resistance in Leipzig working with Alfred Frank and later Hamburg. Together with Maria Grollmuß and Hermann Reinmuth, they supported political prisoners and their families.
Gustav Sadranowski	(1898–1945)					
Änne Saefkow	(1902–1962)	Stenographer, secretary, KPD member		Arrested on 5 July 1944	Sent to Ravensbrück concentration camp on 5 March 1944. Liberated by the Red Army on 1 May 1945	Married to Anton Saefkow and was second wife. Became a resistance fighter in 1941.
Anton Saefkow	(1903–1944)	Metalworker, KPD member, Leader		In July 1944, Saefkow was arrested, sentenced to death by the "People's Court" Volksgerichtshof on 5 September 1944	Executed on 18 September by guillotine at Brandenburg-Görden Prison	
Willi Sänger	(1894–1944)	Communist functionary	Courier to Leipzig for the Schumann-Engert-Kresse group	Arrested on 6 July 1944. On 21 October 1944 he was sentenced to death	On 27 November 1944 he was executed at the Brandenburg-Görden Prison	
Max Sauer	(1893–1961)	Foreman, KPD member	Stolzenberg & Co.		Survived the war	Worked with Erich Fähling to distribute illegal communist newspapers.

=== SC ===
Name	Life	Employment	Position	Arrested	Fate	Notes
Erich Schaeffer			Alkett			
Wilhelm Scheer	(1906–1944)	Painter	Nicolaus & Co	Arrested on 16 July 1944	Sentenced to death on September 19, 1944 and executed together with Basse in Brandenburg-Görden prison on 6 November 1944	Collaborated with Gustav Basse and Erich Fähling. Through Basse, secured a printing press for the Seafkow organisation. Printed and distributed leaflets.
Johann Schellheimer	(1899–1945)	Turner	Hubbe & Farenholtz	Arrested in July 1944	In February 1945, executed in Brandenburg-Görden Prison	Collaborated with Hermann Danz in Magdeburg.
Otto Schernikau	(1900–1978)	Industrial worker			Survived the war	
Albert Schimmel	(1900-?)					
Gustav Schlaupitz			Knorr-Bremse			Collaborated with Max Eckert, Ernst Klein, Jahn Masek, Richard Weißensteiner, and Fritz Giersch but were unable to resist at the politically "cleansed" factory. Provided money to forced foreign labour.
Helene Schlör	(1887–1964)				Survived the war	Wife of Schlör. Married in 1934.
Jakob Schlör	(1888–1956)	Waiter, editor, trade unionist, KPD member			Survived the war	Collaborated with Karl Baier, Georg Dünninghaus, Willi Schönbeck, Franz Demuth, Albert Almstedt and Otto Marquardt. Member of the SED executive committee after the war.
Alfons Schmid			Askania			
Alfred Schmidt	(1891–1985)	Trade unionist, later politician. KPD member			Survived the war	Ran the Erfurt sub-district during the war. KPD organiser.
Franz Schmidt	(1885–1944)	Nurse, courier	Kabelwerk Oberspree		Sentenced to death on 31 August 1944. On 30 October, she was executed in Brandenburg-Görden penitentiary	Provided food and accommodation for illegal workers.
Wilhelm Schmidt	(1895-1944)	Locksmith, KPD member	Teves	Arrested by the Gestapo on 10 August 1944	Sentenced to death for "preparation for high treason"	
Ruth Schneider						Held illegal meetings in her apartment. Collaborated with Käthe Schulz and Caesar Horn.
Grete Schöneck	(1911–2004)	Management secretary, KPD member			Survived the war.	Her mother Pauline Schmidt, who was interrogated died.
Hans Schönfelder	(1921–1944)	Toolmaker	Askania			Distributed illegal leaflets.
Paul Schütze						
Hans Schulz	(1898–1945)	Lathe operator	Ludwig Loewe	Arrested on 27 September 1944	In December 1944 he was sentenced to death for "preparation for high treason". He was executed on 20 April 1945 in Brandenburg-Görden Prison	He distributed illegal pamphlets, conveyed news from foreign channels and collected money and worked with Kurt Winkler to obtain weapons.
Käthe Schulz						Used her home to host leadership meetings of the organisation. Later hid Rudolf Drabinski and a Jewish women.
Egmont Schultz	(1903–1945)	Toolmaker, KPD member	Siemens & Halske	On 17 July 1944 he was arrested. He was sentenced to death for preparing to commit high treason and	He was executed in the courtyard of Brandenburg-Görden prison on 29 January 29, 1945.	Schultz distributed illegal pamphlets, collected money and food stamps for slave workers, and made his home available for illegal meetings.
Marga Schumacher				On 9 September 1944	Savagely beaten by the Gestapo during interrogation as she was Jewish and sent to Ravensbrück concentration camp via Fehrbellin labour education camp. Survived the war.	Worked with the resistance cell ran by Hugo Kapteina. Hans Lippmann, Arthur Grimmer, Reinhold Hermann were part of the cell. Released by the Red Army in April 1945. Hid Georg Dimentstein from the Gestapo after Kapteina was arrested.
Willy Schumacher			Hasse & Wrede			
Georg Schumann	(1886–1945)	Toolmaker, SPD member, KPD Executive, Politician		Arrested on 19 July 1944 by the Gestapo. On 21 November 1944, he was sentenced to death for "preparation for high treason"	Executed in the courtyard of Dresden court on 11 January 1945 at the same time as Otto Engert and Kurt Kresse.	Established the Schumann-Engert-Kresse Organisation.
Martin Schwantes	(1904–1945)	Master watchmaker, KPD member		Arrested on 9 July 1944 and was sentenced to death on 5 November 1944	On 5 February 1945 he was executed in Brandenburg-Görden Prison	Collaborated with Walter Kaßner and Ernst Brandt. KPD instructor. Together with Hermann Danz, Eva Lippold, Friedrich Rödel and Johann Schellheimer, he formed a resistance group active in the Magdeburg area.
Otto Schwandt	(1904-	Baker, turner	Ludwig Loewe	Arrested on 13 October 1944		Survived the war.
Georg Schwarz	(1896–1945)	Baker, KPD member		Arrested on 19 July 1944. Sentenced to death on 23 November 1944	Executed in Dresden in January 1945	Worked to rebuild the banned KPD in Leipzig. Later co-editor of the illegally published newspaper Resistance against war and Nazi rule.
Fritz Schwinzert	(1903–1971)	factory inspector	AEG Turbine		Survived the war	

=== SE ===
Name	Life	Employment	Position	Arrested	Fate	Notes
Martha Segers		Pensioner				
Clemens Seifert	(1905–1981)	KPD member			Survived the war	German worker athlete associated with Paul Hirsch, Paul Seher, Herbert Dymke at the Sportverein Berlin-Neukölln. Helped forced foreign prisoners.
Rudolf Seiffert	(1908–1945)	Pipe fitter, later an auditor, KPD member	Siemens & Halske-Werke	Arrested in September 1944	Sentenced to death by the People's Court on 18 December 1944 and executed by guillotine in Brandenburg-Görden prison on 29 January 1945	Ran a cell in the factory along with Egmont Schultz who was the liaison to the organisation for the factory.
Jacques Seintier	(1921–?)	Toolmaker, KPD member				
Wilhelm Selke	(1893–1945)	Bookbinder		Arrested on 10 August 1944	Kept in prison for two years. A second trial was held in January 1945 against Selke and 13 other defendants. Sentenced to death for high treason on 18 January 1945. Executed on 26 February 1945 in Brandenburg-Görden Prison	Recruited into the Seafkow organisation by Wilhelm Heinze. Formed a trade union in his publishing company "Rudolf Peter". The group collected money and food stamps for the resistance, sought to sabotage the production of Nazi books and spread illegal writings and leaflets.
Kurt Sempf	(1904-?)	Mechanical engineer	FA. Ludwig Loewe			
Ernst Sieber (resistance fighter)	(1916–1994)	Railroad worker		Arrested on 14 August 1944, in Küstrin	Charged in the People's Court for preparation for high treason,favoured by the enemy and war treason. Freed on 14 April 1945 in Bayreuth. Survived the war.	Created sticky notes to post on walls and street lamps. Participated in the dissemination of the illegal paper, Die Innere Front (The Inner Front).
Kurt Siering	(1915-?)	KVJD member				
Hans Ludwig Sierks	(1877–1945)	Civil engineer on railways, Writer, SPD, SAP member		Arrested 3 September 1944.	On 1 December 1944, he was sentenced to death by the Volksgerichtshof. He was shot along with Klaus Bonhoeffer and Rüdiger Schleicher on the night of 22 April 1945	Supported the resistance organisation run by Georg Schumann. Helped Chief of Staff of the Artillery Oberkommando des Heeres General Fritz Lindemann to escape after the failure of the 20 July plot.
Ernst Siebert	(1916–1994)					
Kurt Sindermann	(1904–1945)	SPD, KPD member		Arrested on Wuppertal on 23 June 1933 and sentenced to three years on 31 October 1934 by the Volksgerichtshof. Sent to Sachsenhausen concentration camp and later sent to Buchenwald concentration camp. Released in 1939 and repeatedly rearrested.	Shot by the Gestapo in Radeberg in the Radeberg refugee camp, at the end of March 1945.	Ran the KPD office in Dresden from March 1933 onwards.
Joseph Smolka	(1897–?)	Glassblower, civil servant KPD member later KPO member		Arrested several times in the early 1930s but missed the main wave of arrests later in the war.	Survived the war	Collaborated with Georg Schumann, Theodor Neubauer and Anton Saefkow. Supplied monies to the group.
Herbert Splanemann	(1912–1945)	Toolmaker, KPD member	Alfred Teves	On the 14 December 1944, the People's Court sentenced him to death for "preparation for high treason" and "enemy favouring the war".	On the 29 January 1945, Splanemann was executed in the Brandenburg-Görden prison	Worked with Karl Fübinger, Otto Kroeger, Heinz Drzymala, Wilhelm Schmidt and Paul Richter to establish a resistance cell in the Teves factory.
Alfred Sonneson	(1902–1944)	Turner	L. Schwartzkopff	Arrested on 23 May 1943	Sentenced to death on 25 March 1944. Executed in Brandenburg-Görden Prison on 30 May 1944	
Hermann Stahlberg			Siemens-Plania			
Willi Stoph	(1914–1999)	Bricklayer, KPD member, Politician				Indirect contact with the Saefkow organisation.
Johanna Steinbach	(1894–1968)					Wife of Kurt Steinbach.
Franz Streit	(1898–1945)	Telegraphy technician, KPD member		Arrested 20 July 1944 and sentenced to death on 13 December 1944	Executed on 22 January 22 in Brandenburg-Görden Prison	Sheltered a Jewish couple and their child. Collaborated with Gustav Wegener and delivered a typewriter.
Stanislaus Szczygielski	(1902–1945)	Metal sorter, KPD member	Askania	Arrested 4 August 1944 and sentenced to death 30 November 1944	On 8 January 1945, he was executed at Brandenburg-Görden Prison	Szczygielski donated money to the organization, distributed anti-fascist pamphlets and acted in the role of recruiter.

== T ==
Name	Life	Employment	Position	Arrested	Fate	Notes
Gertrud Temlitz	(1909–1997)	Tailor				Used her house to host illegal meetings that were led by Elli Voigt.
Ferdinand Thomas	(1913–1944)	Economist, KPD member		Arrested on 1 July 1944.	Sentenced to death by 1st Senate of the Volksgerichtshof. On 20 November 1944, he was executed in Brandenberg Prison	Worked as courier for more than 3 years during the war. Was instrumental in bringing together Anton Saefkow and Franz Jacobs.
Ella Trebe	(1902–1943)	Metal worker, KPD member	AEG	Arrested on night of 9 June 1943	Shot and killed in Sachsenhausen concentration camp without a trial	Part of the Berlin region leadership team ("Bezirksleitung") of the KPD. Worked with Wilhelm Guddorf and as a courier maintaining links to other communist cells.
Herbert Tschäpe	(1913–1944)	Construction worker, carpenter, KPD member		Arrested in July 1944	Sentenced to death by the Volksgerichtshof on 24 October 1944 for "preparation to commit treason". Executed in November 1944	Fought in the Spanish Civil War. Functionary in the National Committee for a Free Germany. Later worked for the Saefkow-Jacob-Bästlein Organisation.
Willi Tschorsch	(1899–1975)		AEG Turbine		Survived the war	

== U ==
Name	Life	Employment	Position	Arrested	Fate	Notes
Walter Uhlmann	(1904–1991)	Metal worker, Trade unionist to the KPD		Arrested in 1937	Released in 1945 and survived the war	Organised a union in several metal working companies and edited the illegal newspaper "Der Metallarbeiter, Organ des Aktions-Ausschusses Gruppe Metall" (The Metal Worker, organ of the Metal Group Action Committee).

== V ==
Name	Life	Employment	Position	Arrested	Fate	Notes
Elli Voigt	(1912–1944)	Domestic servant, factory worker, KPD member		Arrested 13 July 1944. Tried on 13 September 1944 and sentenced to death for " preparation for high treason, aiding the enemy and subversion of military power"	Executed on 8 December 1944 in the Plötzensee Prison	Married to Fritz Voigt. Ran a resistance cell in Schönow with Fritz Voigt and Elli Giese.
Fritz Voigt	(1906–1945)	KPD member, former police chief of Breslau				Married to Elli Voight. Drafted into the 999 Penal battalion in 1943.
Kurt Voigt						
Rudolf Voigt						

== W ==
Name	Life	Employment	Position	Arrested	Fate	Notes
Helmut Wagner	(1911–1944)	KPD member		Arrested again on 8 July 8, 1944, sentenced to death on 26 October by the Volksgerichtshof	Executed 4 December 1944 in Brandenburg Prison	Worked with Otto Gresch and Herbert Fölster to run an underground courier service for the group.
Marta Wagner						
Lisa Walter						Girlfriend of Herbert Tschäpe in a Neukölln resistance cell. Introduced Fritz Reuter to Saefkow.
Georgi Wassiljew						Organiser of the resistance in several prisoner-of-war camps, who managed to escape in the early summer of 1944 with the help of Willy Hielscher and Arthur Magnor
Gustav Wegener (resistance fighter)	(1908–1944)	Typesetter, KPD member		Arrested in July 1944	Sentenced to death on 21 October 1944 by the Volksgerichtshof and executed on 11 December 1944 in Brandenburg-Görden Prison	His code name was "Hans". Wegener. He was the main organiser for the production and publishing of underground leaflets for the organisation.
Alfred Weiland	(1906–1978)	Mechanic and telegraph worker, KAPD member			Survived the war	Worked with the communist resistance to organise a number of resistance cells.
Arthur Weisbrodt	1909–1944)	Optician, KPD member	Courier for Rote Hilfe	Arrested on 19 September 1944	Sentenced to death by the Volksgerichtshof and executed on the 6 November 1944 in Brandenburg-Görden Prison	Publisher of the underground newspaper of the Rote Hilfe, the Tribunal.
Martin Weise	(1903–1943)	Journalist, KPD member		8 October 1943 the 2nd Senate of the People's Court condemded him to death.	Executed at Brandenburg-Görden Prison on 15 November 1943	Lead writer of the Die Innere Front.
Wilhelm Weiss (resistance fighter)	(1901–1946)	KPD member	Brandenburgische Motorenwerken (Bramo)	Arrested 1 August 1944	On 6. October 1944 sentenced to 10 years in prison by the Volksgerichtshof. Liberated by the Red Army.	Worked with Heinz Hartwig and Hans Schwarze to form a cell at Bramo.
Richard Weissensteiner	(1907–1943)	Welder, KPD member	Knorr-Bremse	Weißensteiner and his wife were arrested on 16 September 1942	Executed at Plötzensee Prison on 13 May 1943	Met Hans Coppi, later Eugen Neutert and became a member of the Red Orchestra. Attended meetings, distributed leaflets. Also hid the parachutist Albert Hoessler in his apartment.
Richard Wenzel	(1904–1980)	Advertising artist, later politician, KPD member		Arrested on 8 October 1944	Imprisoned in Moabit prison. Liberated by the Red Army. Survived the war	KPD procurement officer.
Fritz Werner			Askania			
Heinrich Werner	(1906–1945)	Clerk with the rank of sergeant in the wehrmacht	Wehrmacht Propaganda Office	Arrested on 8 July 1944	Sentenced to death by the Volksgerichtsh on 18 September 1944. Executed on 15 January 1945 in the Brandenburg-Görden Prison	Acted as an informant by providing official documentation for the group.
Alois Wiesen			Argus AG			Worked with Erwin Reisler and Hans Ackermann in a resistance cell at the welding shop at Argus.
Hermann Wolff	(1906–1945)	Warehouse worker	Askania AG	Arrested on 14 July 1944	On 30 November 1944 was sentenced by the Volksgerichtshof to 10 years in prison. Sent first to Brandenburg-Görden Prison then later transferred to Thuringian Detention Centre where he disappeared.	Worked with Paul Hirsch and Richard Bergow in a resistance cell at Askania. Used his apartment to host meetings with Gustav Wegener.
Emil Wölk	(1903–1944)	Engineer, KPD member	Zeiss, later Sunt Vergaser AG	Arrested on 17 July 1944	Sentenced to death by the Volksgerichtshof on 20 September 1944. Executed on 13 November 1944 in the Brandenburg-Görden Prison	Worked with Theodor Neubauer. Established a cell at Sunt Vergaser AG to sabotage the factory. His wife Annegret used their home for illegal meetings.
Julius Wordelmann	(1885–1945)	Hotel worker, Trade unionist, KPD member		Arrested on 12 August 1944	Sentenced to death on 18 January 1945 for "high treason" and executed 26 February 1945 in the Brandenburg-Görden Prison	Used his position in the hospitality industry to get food stamps and monies to Saefkow for distribution. Also distributed leaflets.

== Z ==
Name	Life	Employment	Position	Arrested	Fate	Notes
Walter Zimmermann	1910–1945	Precision mechanic, KPD member, SPD member	Askania	Arrested on 25 July 1944	Sentenced to death on 30 November 1944 and executed on 8 November 1944. Executed in Brandenburg prison.	Collaborated with Karl Ladé and Kurt Rühlmann and his wife Emma in a resistance cell in Askania.
Gerhard Zeidler	(1912–2001)	Turner	Askania			Worked with Erwin Kerber, Karl Lade and Paul Junius to sabotage machinery at Askania.
Gerhart Ziller	1912–1957	electrical fitter and technical draftsman, KPD member, politician				Sent to concentration camp several times due to resistance activities as member of Anton Saefkow group.
Paul Zobel	1891–1945	Sports editor, KPD member, Politician		Arrested in July 1944 and sent to Dachau concentration camp	Died in Dachau.	Leading member of the communist workers' sports movement. Through Hermann Tops, began to resistance in the group formed by Robert Uhrig, at the end of the 1930s.

== See also ==
- People of the Red Orchestra
