= Kresse =

Kresse is a surname. Notable people with the surname include:

- Bill Kresse (1933–2014), American cartoonist
- Hans G. Kresse (1921–1992), Dutch cartoonist
- John Kresse (born 1943), American basketball coach
- Kurt Kresse (1904–1945), German communist and resistance fighter
