= Neddermeyer =

Neddermeyer is a surname. Notable people with the surname include:

- Robert Neddermeyer (1887–1965), German politician
- Seth Neddermeyer (1907–1988), American physicist
