= Arthur Hoffmann =

Arthur Hoffmann may refer to:

- Arthur Hoffmann (politician) (1857–1927), Swiss politician
- Arthur Hoffmann (athlete) (1887–1931), German athlete
- Arthur Hoffmann (resistance fighter) (1900–1945), German resistance fighter against Nazi Germany
