= Arthur Hoffmann (resistance fighter) =

German resistance member

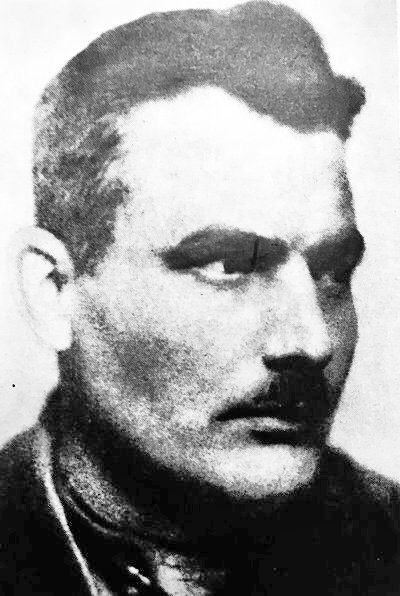
Arthur Hoffmann

Emil Fritz Arthur Hoffmann (29 September 1900 in Neumannswaldau, Silesia – 12 January 1945, executed in Dresden) was a German resistance fighter against the Nazi régime in World War II.

== Life ==
Arthur Hoffmann's beginnings were very humble. He was from a tiny hamlet in Silesia which contained only six houses. His father was a bricklayer and his mother ran a small agricultural enterprise. An hour-long walk took Hoffmann to a second-rate rural school when he was a boy, where the teacher's favour could be bought with gifts of sausages, something well beyond the Hoffmann family's means. After finishing the eighth year of school, Hoffmann was apprenticed as a carpenter. In 1917, he joined the Deutscher Holzarbeiterverband ("German Woodworkers' Union").

In February 1917, during World War I, Hoffmann was called into the 29er Pionieren in Posen (now Poznań, Poland), where his comrades in arms saw fit to elect him to the Soldiers' Council. In 1919, he met his future wife, Dora Hörig while she was visiting a cousin in Silesia. Shortly thereafter, however, Hoffmann went travelling. He wended his way through Germany, finally arriving at Delitzsch, where Weimar Republic political events were brought home to him very clearly. He actively took part in defending the results of the November Revolution in Germany, and for this, he was given two years and ten months in prison for what the court in Torgau deemed to be a breach of the peace. He was, however, freed after one year and nine months under an amnesty.

Hoffmann finally wed Dora on 19 May 1923. They had a daughter and three sons.

== Political activities ==
Arthur Hoffmann joined the Communist Party of Germany (KPD) in 1922, and the Rotfrontkämpferbund (RFB) in 1926; from 1927, he was a member of the West Saxony RFB's district leadership. In 1929, after the RFB was banned, Hoffmann spent three weeks in custody for organizing demonstrations thanks to then Interior Minister Carl Severing. In the same year, however, he became a representative in the Leipzig city parliament. In 1931, after trying to buy some weapons, he was sentenced to five years in prison. He was released the next year, however – again, under an amnesty.

== Resistance activities ==
After the Nazis seized power in 1933 and his flat was stormed by police and SA troops meaning to arrest him – he managed to get away – Hoffmann was sent by the KPD as an organizer of antifascist resistance into the underground in Chemnitz, but was nevertheless arrested in November. In 1934, he was sentenced to three years in Waldheim Labour Prison (Zuchthaus) for "spreading a high-treasonous undertaking". In 1937, his time over, he was then taken into "protective custody", but released on 20 December for good behaviour after having spent a few months in Sachsenburg, and later Buchenwald concentration camp, after the former was shut down. He had to put in writing that he would no longer take up any political activities.

From 1938 to 1944, Hoffmann belonged to the Organizers of Antifascist Resistance in Leipzig, a group about Georg Schumann, a part of the so-called Schumann-Engert-Kresse group. He worked zealously in various armament plants; his political goal was to disrupt and spoil production. From 1943 on, he also worked together with the National Committee Free Germany (Nationalkomitee Freies Deutschland; NKFD).

== Arrest, trial, and death ==
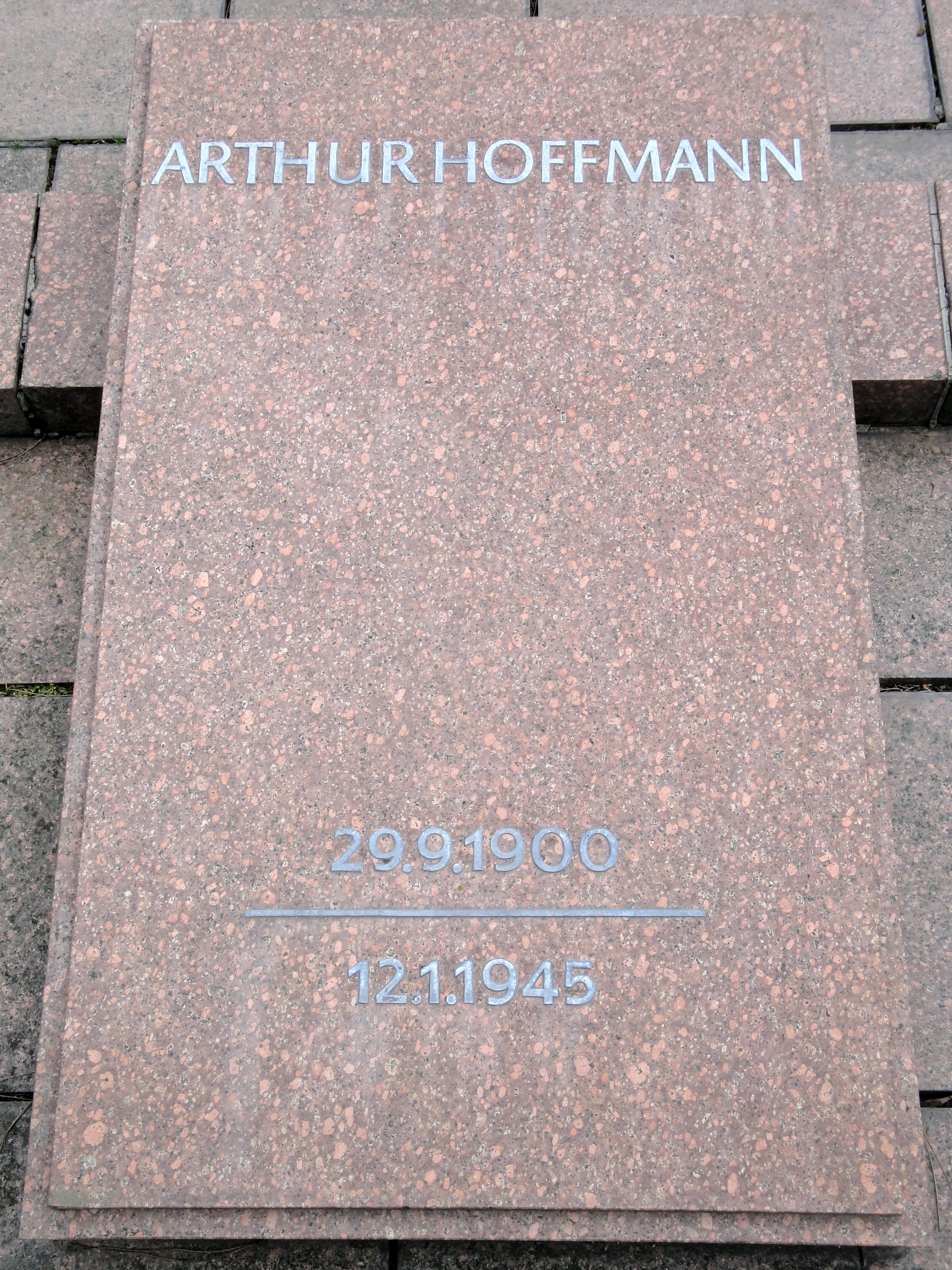
Grave of Arthur Hoffmann at Südfriedhof (Leipzig)

In 1944, Hoffmann was once again arrested, along with his family on 19 July. The proceedings against him before the Second Senate of the Volksgerichtshof on 22 and 23 November ended with a conviction for undermining the fighting forces (Wehrkraftzersetzung), conspiracy to commit high treason, and furthering the enemy's cause (Feindbegünstigung), along with the attendant death sentence. Alfred Frank, Karl Jungbluth, Georg Schwarz and William Zipperer were tried along with Hoffmann. On 12 January 1945, the sentence was carried out in the execution yard at Münchner Platz in Dresden.

== Honours ==
Since 1 August 1945, a main street in Leipzig leading from Bayrischer Platz to Connewitz has borne the name Arthur-Hoffmann-Straße (its former name is Bayrische Straße). Arthur Hoffmann and his family lived there.

Until 1992, the Third Polytechnic Secondary School (3. Polytechnische Oberschule) in Leipzig (Bernhard-Göring-Straße 107) bore the name Arthur-Hoffmann-Oberschule.
