= Judith Auer =

Swiss resistance fighter (1905–1944)

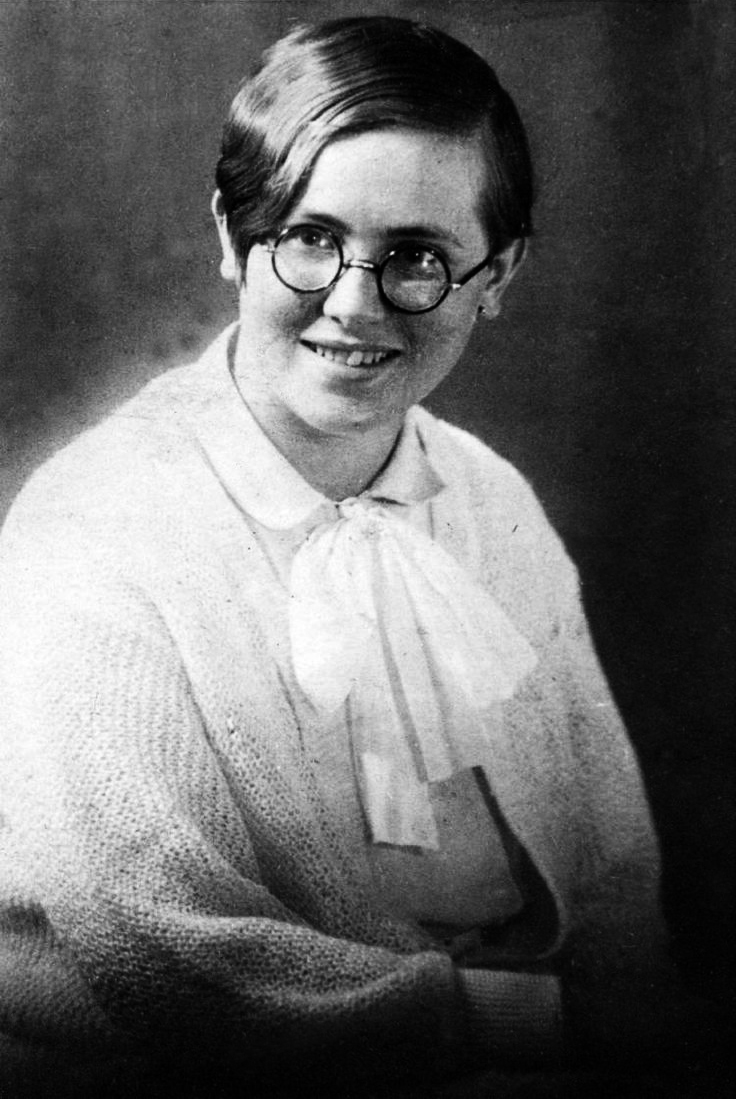
- Born: Judith Vallentin; September 19, 1905; Zürich, Switzerland
- Died: October 27, 1944 (aged 39); Plötzensee Prison, Berlin, Nazi Germany
- Cause of death: Execution by hanging

Judith Auer (née Vallentin) (19 September 1905 – 27 October 1944) was a Swiss resistance fighter against the Nazi régime in Germany.

== Early life ==
Auer was born in Zürich. Her father was the communist writer, Erich Vallentin. After her parents' untimely death in 1917, Judith was brought up by a well-to-do Jewish family. She completed her Abitur and began studies in music in the hopes of becoming a pianist.

In 1924, as a student, she joined the Young Communist League of Germany, and the next year, moved to Berlin. There, she met and married Erich Auer, a functionary in the Communist Party of Germany (KPD), in 1926. In 1927, she joined the KPD. In 1928, Auer went to Moscow with her husband and worked at the Comintern's offices.

In 1929, her daughter Ruth was born. To earn money, Auer learned typing and shorthand and took a job at a KPD establishment.

== Resistance activities ==
After Hitler seized power in Germany in 1933 and the KPD was banned by the new régime, Auer eventually found herself working for AEG at the Kabelwerk Oberspree ("cable works"), first as a shorthand typist, and later as a buying agent. It was here that Auer first came into contact with the resistance group around Fritz Plön, a welder, who himself had contacts with the resistance group around Anton Saefkow, Franz Jacob, Bernhard Bästlein and Karl Klodt, the Saefkow-Jacob-Bästlein Organization. Auer had also had a long friendship with Änne Weiß, who became Saefkow's wife. Auer managed her resistance group's finances and used business trips to do courier work, especially with a view to establishing links with resistance fighters in Thuringia, such as Theodor Neubauer. She also hid Franz Jacob in her flat for several months after he fled from Hamburg.

== Arrest and execution ==
Auer was arrested at her workplace on 7 July 1944 and was later tortured. Along with Bruno Hämmerling and Franz Schmidt, she was sentenced to death at the Volksgerichtshof. Auer was hanged at Plötzensee Prison in Berlin on 27 October 1944.

== Legacy ==
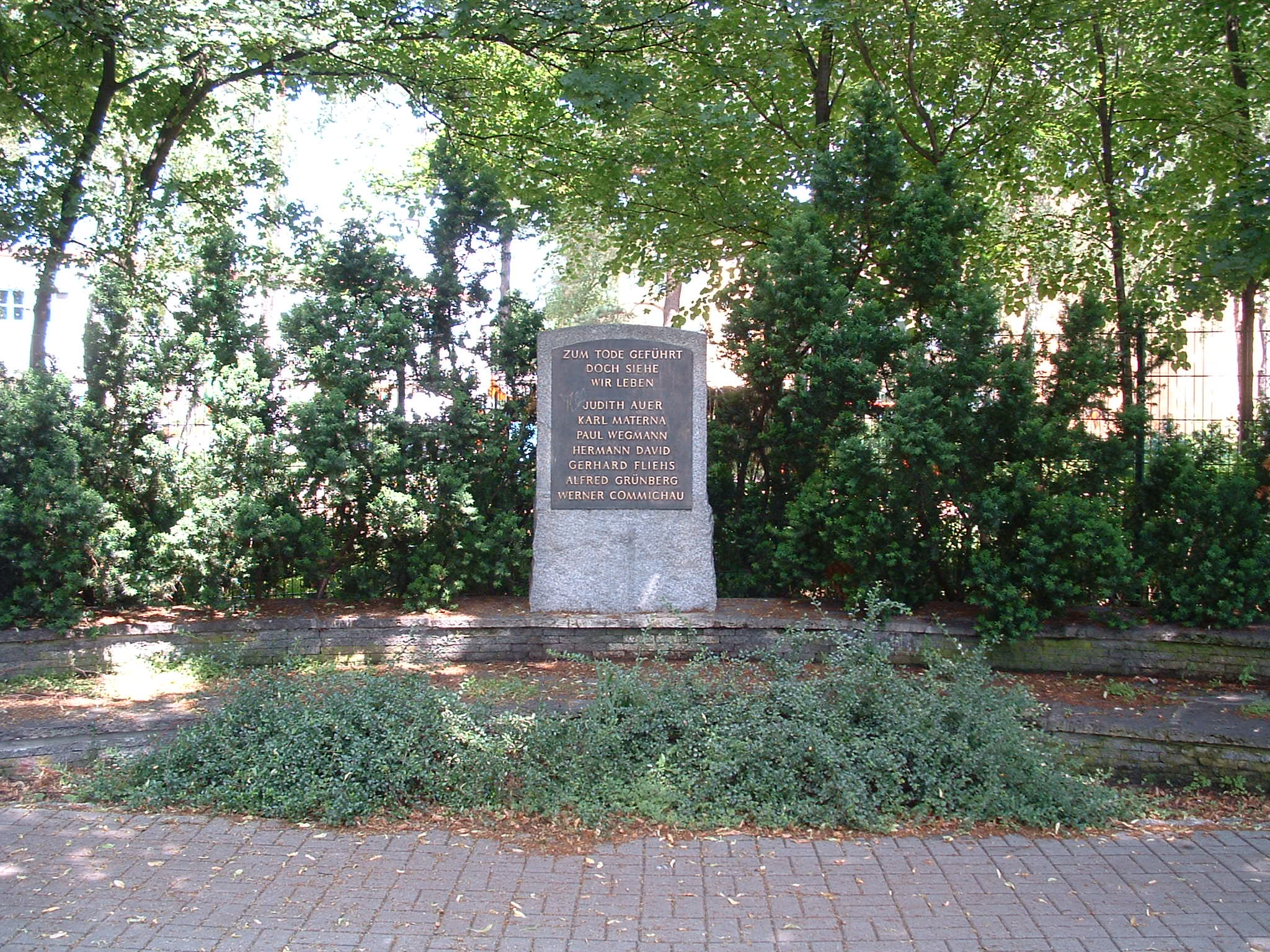
Memorial in Berlin-Bohnsdorf for seven Bohnsdorfers killed resisting the Nazi government. The caption reads: Brought to death, yet see: we live

There are streets named for Auer in Berlin, Leipzig and Jena. In the former East Germany, there are several public institutions named after her as well.

== See also ==
- List of Germans who resisted Nazism
