= Julius Balkow =

East German engineer and politician (1909–1973)

Deputy Chairman of the Council of Ministers
- In office March 1965 – November 1967
- Preceded by: Bruno Leuschner

Minister of Foreign Trade
- In office July 1961 – March 1965
- Preceded by: Heinrich Rau
- Succeeded by: Horst Sölle

Personal details
- Born: 26 August 1909 Berlin, German Empire
- Died: 19 July 1973 (aged 63) East Berlin, East Germany
- Party: Communist Party; Socialist Unity Party of Germany
- Education: Leipzig University
- Awards: Banner of Labor

Julius Balkow (1909–1973) was an East German engineer and socialist politician who served as the minister of foreign trade from 1961 to 1965 and deputy chairman of the Council of Ministers from 1965 to 1967. Being a member of the central committee of the Socialist Unity Party of Germany (SED) he was a member of the East German Parliament between 1963 and 1973.

== Early life and education ==
Balkow was born in Berlin on 26 August 1909 into a working-class family. He attended a secondary school and trained as a machine fitter from 1926 to 1929. He attended evening courses in mechanical engineering between 1927 and 1931 and passed the engineering exam in 1931. During his studies he was a member of the Socialist Workers' Youth and the Workers' Gymnastics and Sports Association.

Balkow continued his education in East Germany where he graduated from Leipzig University receiving a degree in economics in 1949.

== Career and activities ==
Balkow joined the Communist Party (KPD) in 1931. He was part of the Anton Saefkow resistance group in Berlin during the Nazi rule and also, worked as an engineer in Siemens company. He was arrested by the Gestapo in 1944 and sentenced to seven years in prison. He was detained in the Brandenburg prison until 1945. After his release from prison Balkow became district mayor and district chairman of the KPD in Berlin. He joined the SED, founding and ruling party of East Germany, and served as its district secretary in Teltow between 1946 and 1947. He was a member of the SED Mitte district between 1950 and 1951. He was employed at the Ministry for Foreign Trade and Inner German Trade from 1951 and was named as the deputy minister of foreign trade in 1956 which he held until 1961.

Balkow was appointed minister of foreign trade and inner German trade in July 1961, succeeding Heinrich Rau in the post. His tenure ended in March 1965, and Horst Sölle was appointed to the post.

Balkow was named as the deputy chairman of the Council of Ministers in charge of foreign trade in March 1965, succeeding Bruno Leuschner. He was invited to visit the Hanover Fair in Spring 1966, but the West German authorities did not grant him an entry visa due to the objections of the Federal Government. Balkow was in office until November 1967 when he was removed from the post. The official reason for his removal was given as health concerns, but Balkow's conflicts with the SED officials, including Erich Honecker, played a significant role in the incident.

Balkow was made a member of the SED central committee in 1963 and held the post until November 1967. He was also a member of the East German Parliament from 1963 to 1973. He headed the committee of foreign affairs between 1971 and 1973.

== Death ==
Balkow died in East Berlin on 19 July 1973 at the age of 63.

=== Awards ===
Balkow was the recipient of the Banner of Labor which he was awarded in 1969.
