= Alfred Frank =

German painter, sculptor and communist

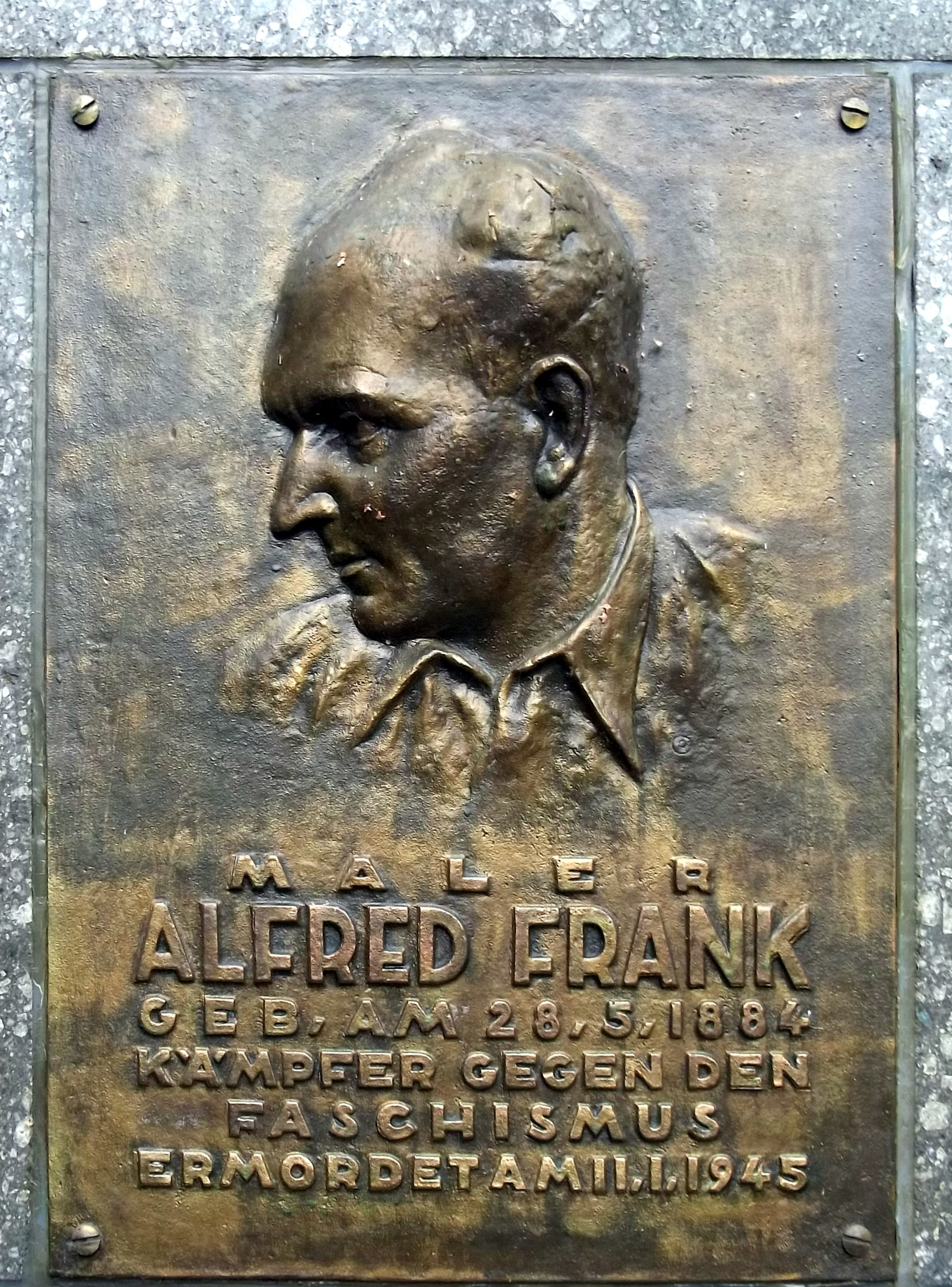
Memorial plaque of Alfred Frank in the Lübschützer Teiche recreation area, Machern near Leipzig

Alfred Frank (28 May 1884 – 12 January 1945) was a German painter, sculptor, lithographer and communist.

== Biography ==
Alfred Frank was the son of a gardener. He first completed an apprenticeship as a lithographer and joined the SPD in Leipzig in 1906. From 1906 to 1908 and from 1910 to 1912 he attended the evening school of the Royal Academy of Graphic Arts and Book Trades and became a portrait and landscape painter, but also worked as a printmaker.

After returning from the First World War, he joined the Communist Party of Germany in 1919 and designed posters and banners for the party and from 1923 and worked as a press illustrator for the communist Sächsische Arbeiter-Zeitung. From 1925 he taught at the Leipzig adult education center. In 1928 Frank joined the Association of Revolutionary Visual Artists (ASSO), of which he became the Leipzig representative. He also worked as a teacher at the Marxist Workers' School.

After the Nazis seized power in 1933, Frank was dismissed from the adult education center and taken into protective custody until the autumn, then sentenced to a year in prison in 1934. In 1935/36 he founded a resistance group together with other intellectuals, which at the beginning of the Second World War, joined the resistance group around Georg Schumann and Kurt Kresse. On July 19, 1944, Alfred Frank was arrested again, and sentenced to death by the People's Court on November 23. He was executed in the courtyard of the Dresden Regional Court on January 12, 1945, at the age of 60.

== Memory ==
Alfred Frank lived from 1914 until his arrest at Schleußiger Quandtstrasse, which in 1946 was named Alfred-Frank-Strasse. A memorial plaque at the illegal meeting point at the Lübschütz pond commemorates Frank, as does a memorial plaque on the residential building in Leipzig. A square in the Reudnitz district bears his name. The Alfred-Frank-Oberschule in Hohburg and in Grimma, a polytechnic high school in Leipzig-Gohlis, as well as the Alfred-Frank-Schulen in Bad Düben, Rackwitz and in Leipzig are named after him.
