= Margarete Blank =

German doctor executed for defeatism during WW2

- photographed in 1930
- Born: 21 February 1901; Kiev
- Died: 8 February 1945 (aged 43); Dresden
- Other names: Margot
- Occupation: Physician
- Known for: Execution towards the end of the Second World War

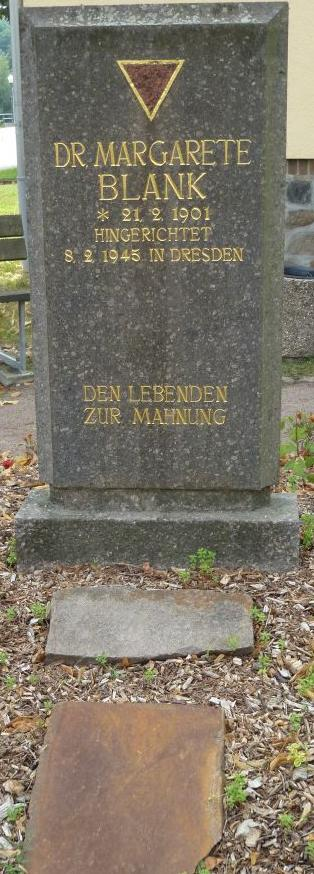
Memorial in Panitzsch

Margarete Blank (1901–1945) was a German medical doctor who was executed for defeatist speech in 1945. There are now several memorials to her including street names in Engelsdorf and Panitzsch; old people's homes in Prenzlau and Thekla, Leipzig; schools in Panitzsch and Torgau; and an annual prize for a work of medical history at the Leipzig Medical School.
