= Robert Neddermeyer =

German politician

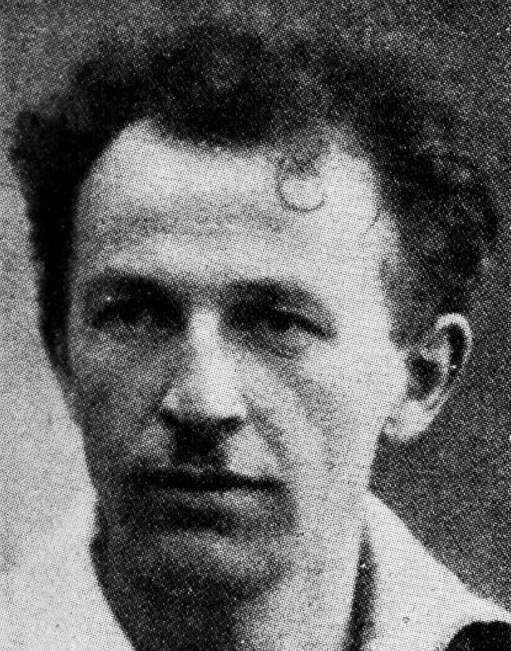
- Neddermeyer c. 1928
- Born: 3 April 1887; Altona, Hamburg, Germany
- Died: 18 October 1968 (aged 81); Potsdam, East Germany
- Occupations: Sailor/telegraph worker Political activist Politician
- Political party: SPD; KPD; VdgB

Robert Neddermeyer (3 April 1887 in Altona – 18 October 1965 in Potsdam) was a German political activist and Communist politician.

== Life ==
=== Early years ===
Neddermeyer was born in the Altona district of Hamburg during the final years of the Bismarck era. His father was a port worker and a sailor. On leaving school his early work included periods both at sea and, as a building worker and later on the railways and as a Hamburg telegraph operator, on land. He became a trades unionist in 1901 and in 1904 he joined the Social Democratic Party.

He interrupted his work with the telegraph service for a period of service in the navy between 1909 and 1912, and then served in the navy again during the First World War. He was an active participant in the Kiel mutiny which kicked off the German Revolution of 1918–19.

=== Weimar years ===
During the 1914/18 war the political left in Germany split, primarily over the issue of support for the war, and following the foundation of what later became known as the Weimar republic, Neddermeyer joined the newly formed German Communist Party (KPD). In the autumn of 1921 he underwent a political training course at the Party School in Berlin, and then between 1922 and 1926 served as party secretary to various regional Communist Party Associations, including a period at Bielefeld in 1923 when he took on a regional leadership party function.

1924 began as a crisis year, with inflation out of control and acute economic hardship widespread. There were two national elections in a single year. At the first of these, in May, Robert Neddermeyer was elected as a KPD member of the National Reichstag in Weimar. Communist party support nationally fell back later in the year after the reparations issue was partially addressed and the economy began to stabilise, but Neddermeyer held on to his own Reichstag seat until 1928. In 1924 he had also participated in the Fifth World Congress of the Comintern. Following the death of Lenin and his successor's change of strategy, the German Communist party became riven with internal divisions of its own. In 1925 Neddermeyer sided unambiguously with the so-called "ultra-left" faction.

On leaving the National Assembly in 1928 Neddermeyer was promptly elected to the Regional Assembly in Prussia, where he sat as a member continuously till 1933. Meanwhile, in 1930 he also became the owner of a small poultry farm near Liebenwalde, which he held on to till 1945, while also working as a poultryman for other farmers in the area. In 1930 he also found time to become a city councillor in Königsberg, another office which he retained till 1933. In 1931 he established the Revolutionary Agricultural Workers' Association of East Prussia (Revolutionären Landarbeiterverband Ostpreußen), becoming the organisation's first chairman.

=== Nazi years ===
In January 1933 the Nazi Party seized power and rapidly put an end to multi-party democratic government. Neddermeyer became part of the (necessarily underground) illegal Communist resistance in Germany. His activities included editing "Socialist Republic", an underground newspaper based in Cologne with a circulation of between 1,000 and 2,000 copies per edition.

On account both of his Communist past and of his resistance activities, between 1933 and 1945 Neddemeyer frequently found himself arrested and placed in prisons or concentration camps. He was interned in concentration camps at Sachsenhausen and at Esterwegen. On 18 July 1944 he was arrested as a member of the Anton Saefkow group and on 6 October 1944 sentenced to three years in prison, but his sentence was cut short in April 1945 when he was released from the prison at Brandenburg-Görden as the war ended.

=== The Soviet occupation zone / East Germany ===
In 1945 Robert Neddermeyer served briefly as the mayor of Liebenwalde, the town near to which he still owned a small chicken farm. Between 1945 and 1946, he was Deputy Administrator of the important Niederbarnim region, subsequently renamed. In parallel to this he also served as District High Commissioner in Bernau. He was also de facto chairman of the Brandenburg State Land Commission and Brandenburg regional secretary (later chairman) of the Peasants' Mutual Aid Association (VdgB / Vereinigung der gegenseitigen Bauernhilfe). The VdgB had some of the features of a political party. East Germany is generally identified as a one party state because one party, the Socialist Unity Party of Germany (SED Sozialistische Einheitspartei Deutschlands) monopolised power. But there were other parties - for most of the time five - with fixed quotas of seats in the National Legislative Assembly (Volkskammer), were organised into a single Bloc party. This was controlled, along with other "mass organisations" by the ruling SED (party) through an institution called the (East German) National Front. The VdgB was one of the mass organisations included in the National Front and which also, from 1953 till 1960 (and again after 1986) had seats in the Volkskammer.

Neddermeyer succeeded Richard Kramer as secretary of the VdgB in March 1947, continuing in this position for approximately eighteen months. He then, in 1949, briefly served as the organisation's chairman. He also, in 1948, became a member of the Brandenburg Regional Assembly where between 1950 and 1952 he sat on the Agriculture and Forestry Committee. His career in the Brandenburg assembly came to an end when the Brandenburg assembly was dissolved as part of a wider reconfiguration of regional government. Much power passed now to Berlin, while residual powers of the regional assemblies were transferred to District Assemblies: in 1952 Richard Neddermeyer became a member of the Potsdam District Assembly.

== Publications ==
- Landarbeiter im Kampf gegen Barone, Nazis und Bonzen!, 1932. (Communist Party election material)
- Es Begann in Hamburg. Ein Deutscher Kommunist Erzählt aus Seinem Leben, Berlin 1980. (quasi-autobiography (ghost-)written and edited by Martha Born und Heinz Heitzer :posthumously published by Karl Grünberg)
