= Theodor Neubauer =

German politician and resistance fighter (1890–1945)

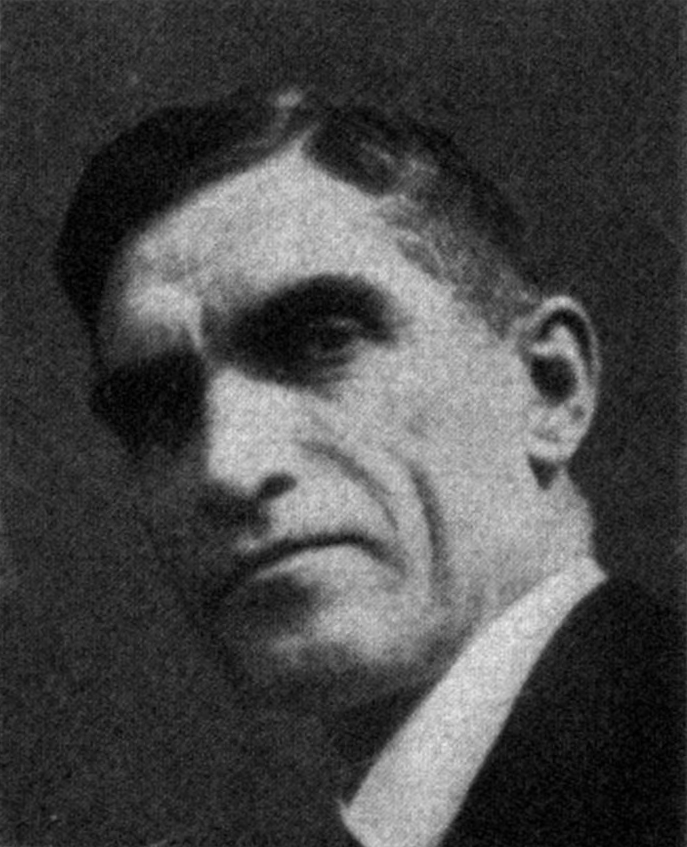
- Neubauer c. 1930

Member of the Reichstag for Düsseldorf East
- In office 5 January 1925 – 28 February 1933
- Preceded by: Multi-member district
- Succeeded by: Constituency abolished

Member of the State Council of Thuringia for Gotha
- In office 16 October 1923 – 12 November 1923
- Minister-President: August Frölich
- Preceded by: Hermann Brill
- Succeeded by: Hugo Woenne

Member of the Landtag of Thuringia
- In office September 1921 – August 1924

Personal details
- Born: 12 December 1890 Ermschwerd, Grand Duchy of Hesse, German Empire
- Died: 5 February 1945 (aged 54) Brandenburg an der Havel, Province of Brandenburg, Free State of Prussia, Nazi Germany
- Cause of death: Execution by guillotine
- Party: DDP (1918–1919); USPD (1919–1920); KPD (1920–1945)
- Other offices held: 1925: Political Leader, Ruhr KPD

Dr. Theodor Thilo Neubauer (12 December 1890 – 5 February 1945) was a German communist politician, educator, essayist, historian and anti-Nazi resistance fighter.

== Biography ==
=== Early life ===
Theodor Neubauer was born in the family of an estate inspector. His father was a German nationalist and monarchist and raised Theodor accordingly. He attended high school in Erfurt from 1901 to 1910, then studied history and modern languages for the next three years in Brussels, Jena and Berlin. He obtained a doctorate in 1913. From 1917 to 1923, he taught in Erfurt, then Ruhla and Weimar.

Of national-liberal tendency, he enlisted in the army in 1914 with the rank of lieutenant and fought on the Russian front where he was demobilized in 1917 after gas poisoning.

In December 1918, he joined the German Democratic Party, then turned to the left and became a member of the Independent Social Democratic Party of Germany (USPD) in late summer 1919, before joining the Communist Party of Germany (KPD) with the left wing of the USPD in December 1920.

=== Communist functionary ===
He was elected to the Landtag of Thuringia in September 1921. Also elected to the State Council in Thuringia in October 1923, he had to flee after the overthrow of the SPD-KPD coalition government which had been established there.

Having become editor of the Freiheit newspaper in Düsseldorf, he was elected a member of the Reichstag in the elections of 1924, re-elected in 1928, 1930, 1932 and 1933.

In 1930, he was elected member of the Central Committee of the KPD, responsible for foreign policy issues, and, temporarily, for social policy. In 1932, Neubauer published the book Deutsche Außenpolitik heute und morgen (German foreign policy today and tomorrow). Apart from his sociopolitical works, Neubauer also composed some 150 poems.

=== Resistance and death ===
In March 1933, he went into hiding but was arrested on August 3. He was held in the prisons of Plötzensee and Brandenburg and the concentration camps of Lichtenburg and Buchenwald. Pardoned, he left Buchenwald in early July 1939 and returned to his family in Thuringia. He renewed contact with the Communists of the region and set up with Magnus Poser, a carpenter in Jena, a resistance network. Until autumn 1943, the Neubauer-Poser network carried out actions in liaison with other communist groups, in particular the group of Anton Saefkow. He managed to communicate with the resistants of Buchenwald who received weapons.

Following an illegal meeting in Leipzig, he was arrested in July 1944 and sentenced to death on January 8, 1945. Theodor Neubauer was guillotined on February 5 in the Brandenburg Prison.

== Memory ==
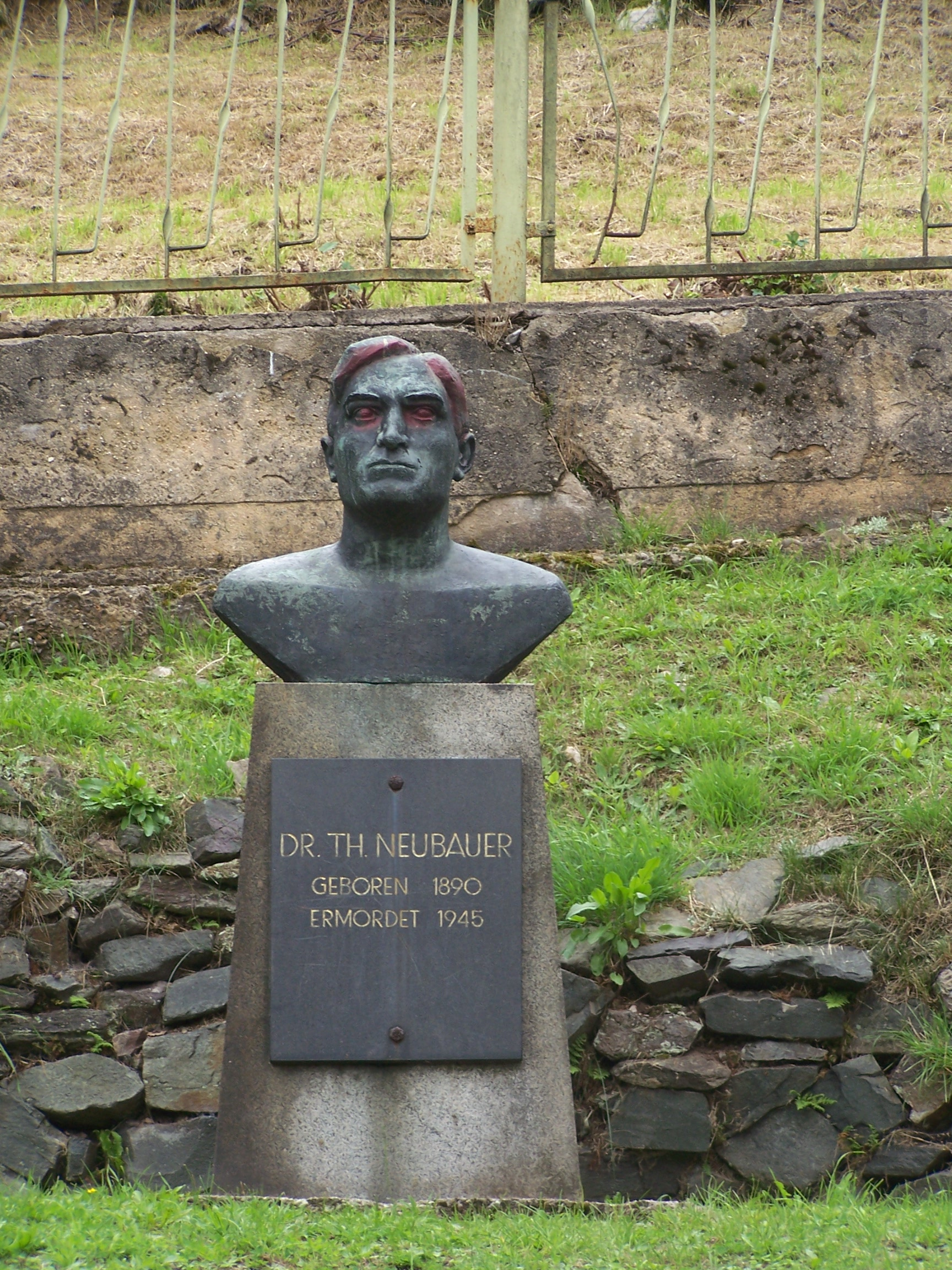
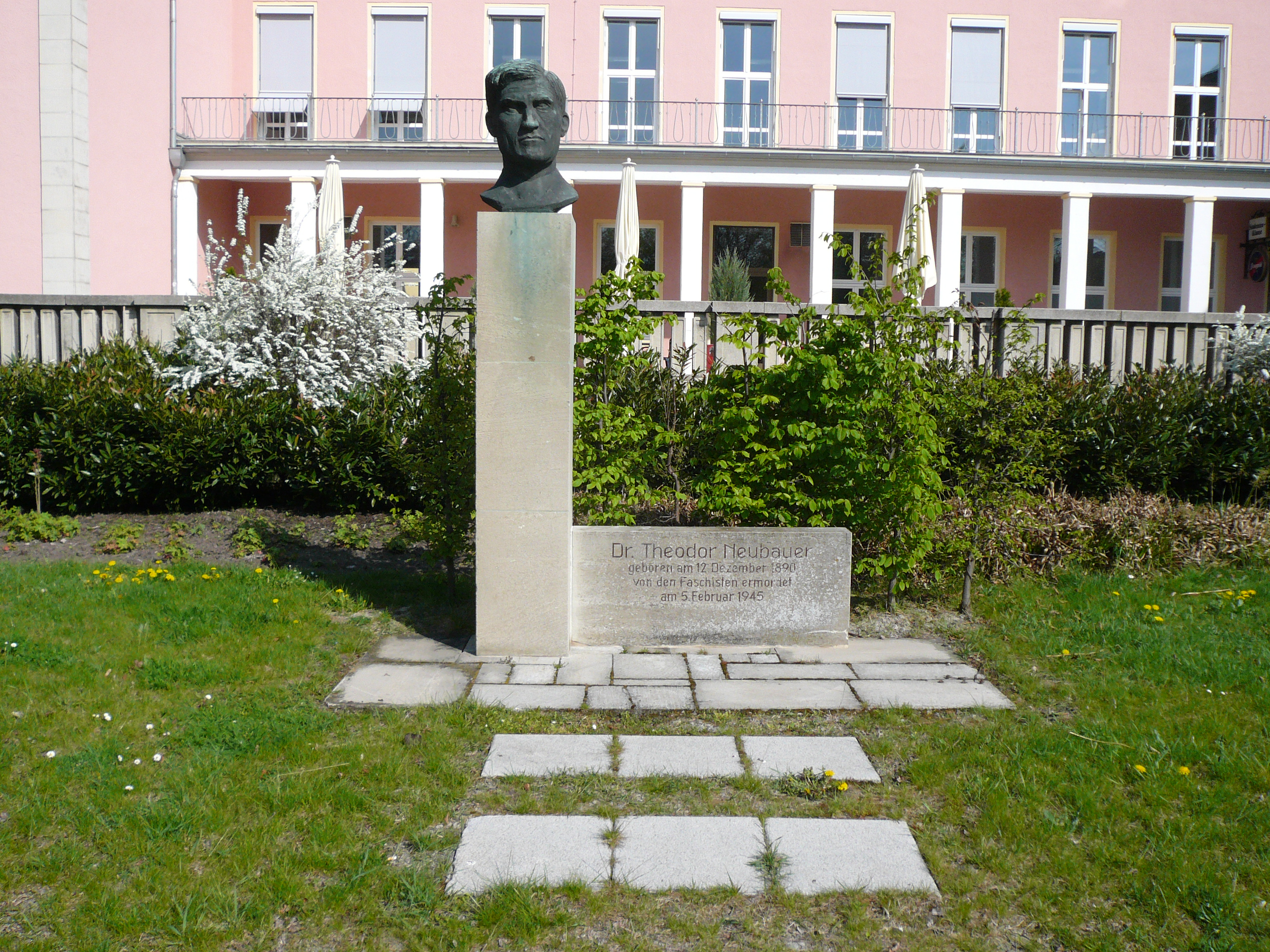
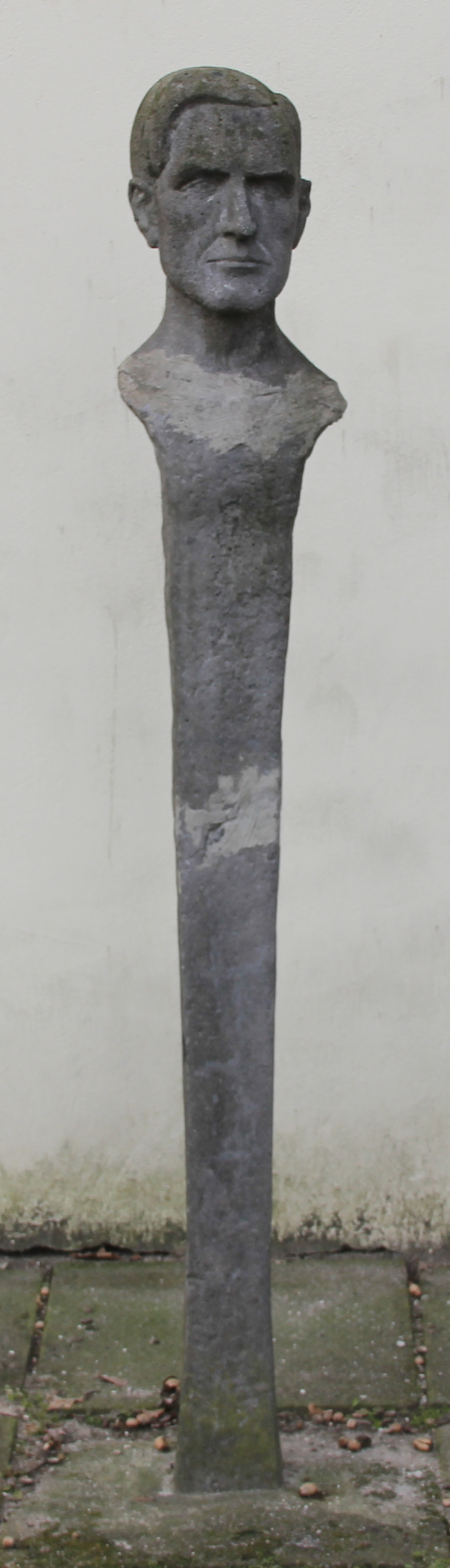
Monuments to Neubauer in Ruhla (left), Erfurt (middle), and Berlin (right)

In East Germany, Theodor Neubauer was honored as an anti-fascist resistance fighter. Streets and schools were named after him and monuments erected in his honor. In 1969 the Erfurt/Mühlhausen University of Education was named after him. After 1990, these honors were withdrawn in most places. Since 1992, one of the 96 memorial plaques for members of the Reichstag murdered by the Nazis near the Reichstag in Berlin has commemorated Neubauer. In the memorial for the anti-fascist resistance fighters executed in the Brandenburg-Görden prison in Brandenburg an der Havel, Theodor Neubauer is mentioned as one of the four executed. The Dr.-Theodor-Neubauer-Medaille was established by the East German government in 1959.

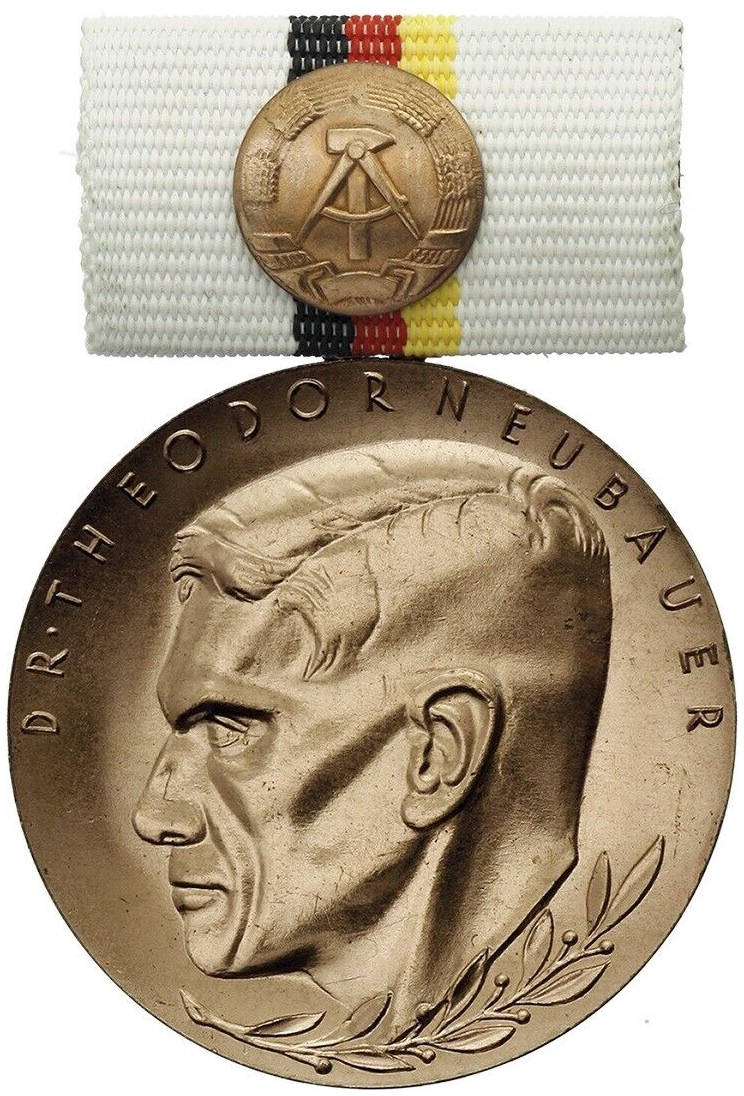
The Dr. Theodor Neubauer Medal

His last known place of residence was the house at Lauchagrundstraße 13/Theodor-Neubauer-Park in Bad Tabarz, on which a commemorative plaque is attached and in front of which a stumbling block is embedded in the sidewalk.

== Works ==
- Die sozialen und wirtschaftlichen Verhältnisse der Stadt Erfurt vor Beginn der Reformation, Erfurt, 1913 (PhD thesis)
- Luthers Frühzeit. Seine Universitäts- u. Klosterjahre: d. Grundlage s. geistigen Entwicklung, Erfurt, 1917
- Deutsche Außenpolitik heute und morgen, Internationaler Arbeiter-Verlag, Vienna, 1932.
- Das tolle Jahr von Erfurt, Hrsg. v. Martin Wähler, Weimar, 1948
- Die neue Erziehung in der sozialistischen Gesellschaft, Verlag der Tribune, Erfurt, 1920 (republished Volk und Wissen Verlag, Berlin/GDR, 1973)
- Aus Reden und Aufsätze, SED-Bezirkskommission zur Erforschung der Geschichte der örtlichen Arbeiterbewegung, Erfurt, 1965
