= Georg Schumann (resistance fighter) =

German resistance fighter

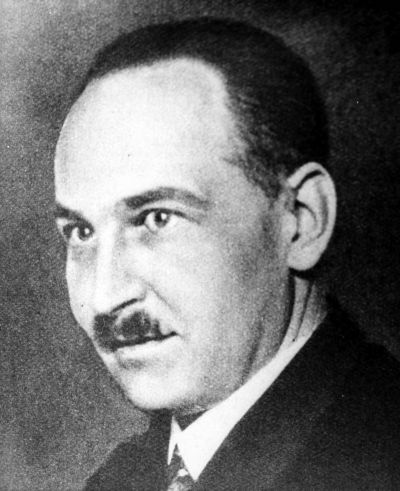
- Schumann c. 1928

Member of the Reichstag for Thuringia
- In office 20 May 1928 – 28 February 1933
- Preceded by: Multi-member district
- Succeeded by: Constituency abolished

Member of the Landtag of Prussia for Merseburg
- In office 10 March 1921 – 5 January 1925
- Preceded by: Multi-member district
- Succeeded by: Multi-member district

Personal details
- Born: 28 November 1886 Reudnitz, Kingdom of Saxony, German Empire
- Died: 11 January 1945 (aged 58) Dresden, Free State of Saxony, Nazi Germany
- Party: SPD (1905–1919); KPD (1919–1945)
- Other political affiliations: Spartacus League (1914–1918)
- Children: Horst
- Occupation: Politician; Journalist; Toolmaker

Military service
- Allegiance: German Empire
- Branch/service: Imperial German Army
- Years of service: 1916–1918
- Battles/wars: World War I
- Central institution membership: 1927–1929: Full member, KPD Central Committee; 1923–1924, : Full member, KPD Zentrale; 1920–1923: Member, KPD Central Commission; Other offices held: 1927–1929: Political Leader, West Saxony KPD; 1921–1923, 1926: Political Leader, Halle-Merseburg KPD; 1919–1921: Political Leader, Leipzig KPD

Georg Schumann (German: [ˈɡeː.ɔʁk ˈʃuː.man]; 28 November 1886 – 11 January 1945) was a German communist and resistance fighter against the Nazi regime.

== Life ==
=== Imperial Germany ===
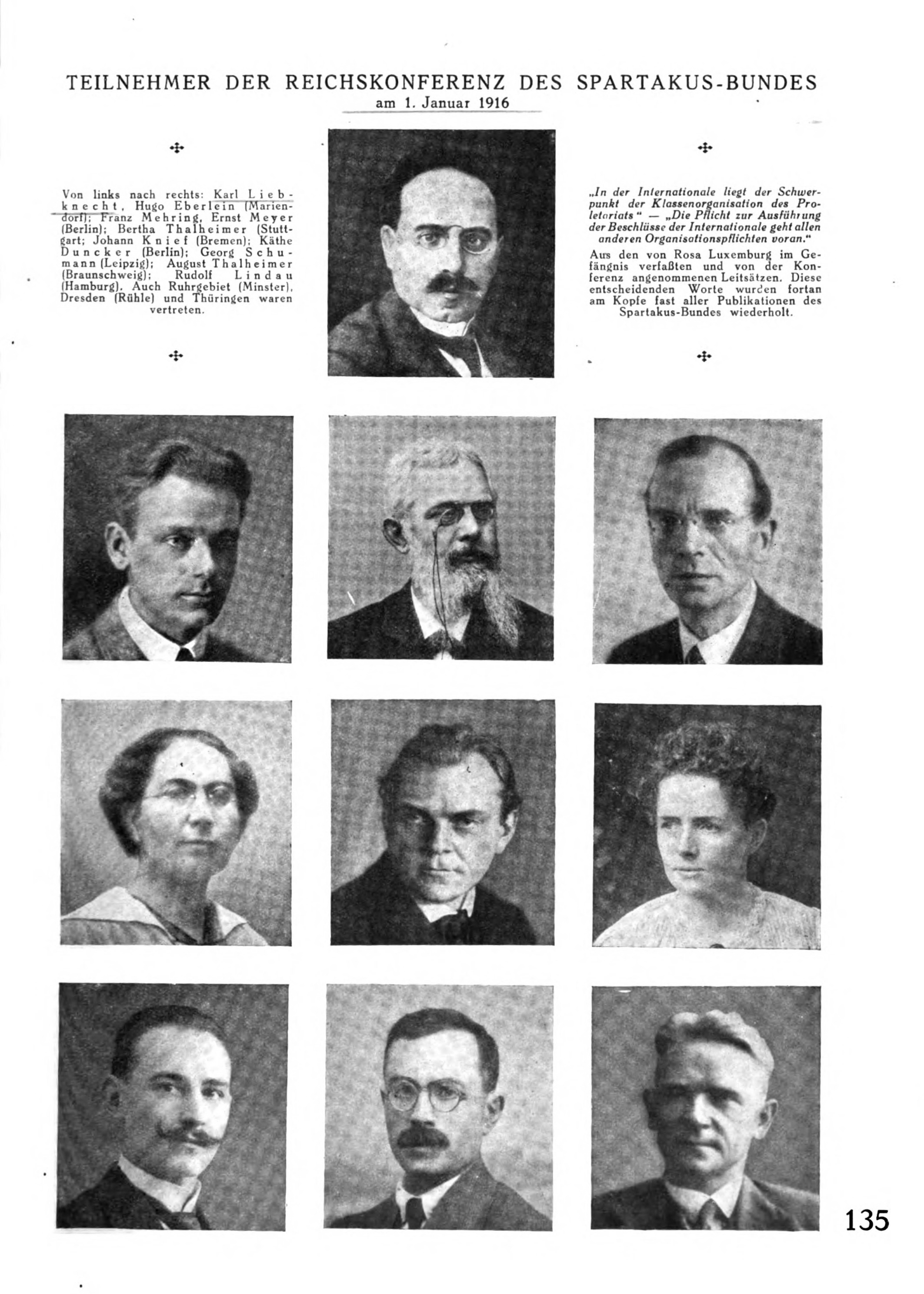
Schumann (bottom row, left) among participants of the Reich Conference of the Spartacus League, 1 January 1916

Schumann was born in Reudnitz, Saxony (later a district of Leipzig) on 28 November 1886. His father was a lithographer and a socialist. Schumann became a skilled toolmaker and joined the Social Democratic Party of Germany (SPD) in 1905, and was chosen to be shop steward in Jena in 1907. In 1912, attended the Social Democratic Party School in Jena, where Rosa Luxemburg discovered his journalistic gift. The SPD posted him at the Leipziger Volkszeitung newspaper in 1913 as editor.

During World War I, Schumann joined the Gruppe Internationale (see Spartacist League) founded by Luxemburg, Karl Liebknecht and Clara Zetkin and agitated in the Leipziger Arbeiterjugend (Leipzig Working Youth) against the war. In 1916, he was conscripted into the transport corps, and for doing illegal work for the Spartacist League within the army he was sentenced to hard labour, imprisoned for 12 years but freed by the November Revolution in 1918.

One of his guards was the later Communist revolutionary Max Hoelz, whom Schumann acquainted with socialism's fundamentals.

=== Weimar Republic ===
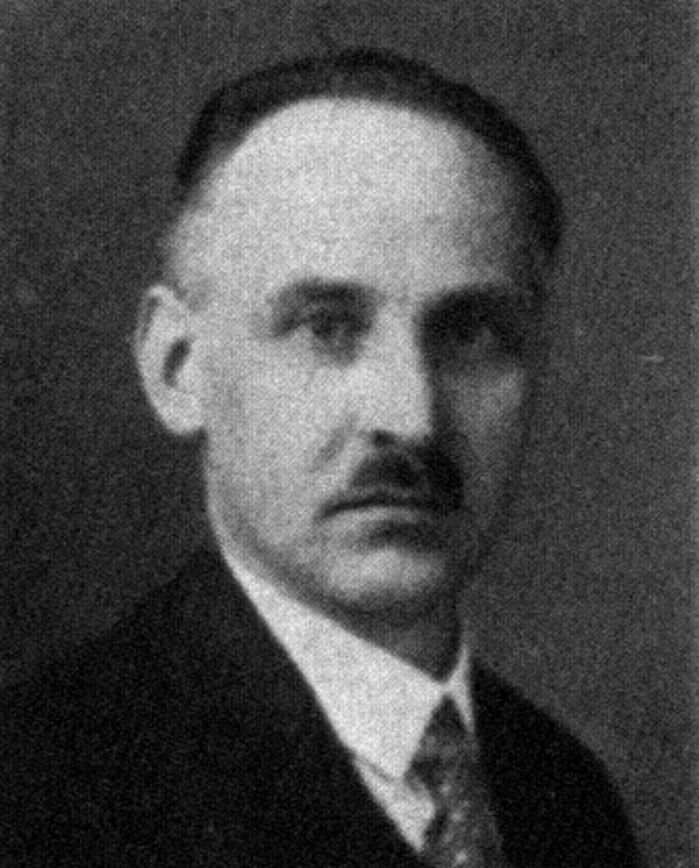
Schumann's official Reichstag portrait, 1930

In November 1918, Schumann led the Spartacist League in Leipzig. In 1919 he was elected Polleiter (political leader) of the Leipzig district of the Communist Party of Germany (KPD), and in 1921 political leader of the Halle-Merseburg district. The same year he was elected to the Prussian Landtag. In 1923, the Party Congress chose him for a position in the Party's Central Committee, and Willy Sachse succeeded him in Halle-Merseburg. In the factional struggles after the KPD's so-called "October Defeat" in 1923, Schumann joined the so-called Middle Group. The ultraleftists did not choose him again for the Central Committee position in 1924.

In late 1924, his Landtag mandate expired, and along with it, his immunity. Since he had been a member of the KPD Central Committee, he was persecuted by the police. He emigrated in early 1925 to Moscow. In March 1926, he returned to Germany to become Party leader in Halle-Merseburg once again, but instead he was arrested, and spent almost a year in pre-trial custody. In 1927, he was chosen to be in the Central Committee again, and he became Political Leader in West Saxony (Leipzig), and in 1928, a Member of the Reichstag. In the factional struggles in 1929, he once again sided with the Middle Group, the Conciliator faction. The victorious left wing about Ernst Thälmann therefore removed him from his post as Leader in West Saxony over storms of protest. In late 1929, he submitted to the Thälmann line. In 1930–1933, he was once again a Member of the Reichstag, and busied himself above all with the Communist jobless workers' movement.

=== Nazi Germany ===
Schumann co-founded one of the most active communist resistance groups that known as the Schumann-Engert-Kresse Gruppe, along with Otto Engert and Kurt Kresse.

In the summer of 1944 Schumann and Engert were arrested by the Gestapo and severely tortured during interrogation. Schumann was sentenced to death for "preparation for high treason" and executed in Dresden on January 11, 1945. After the war, his urn was buried together with those of other leading members of the resistance group in Leipzig's southern cemetery in a prominent position on the central axis of the main path.

His son Horst Schumann was chairman of the FDJ from 1959 to 1967.

== Honours ==
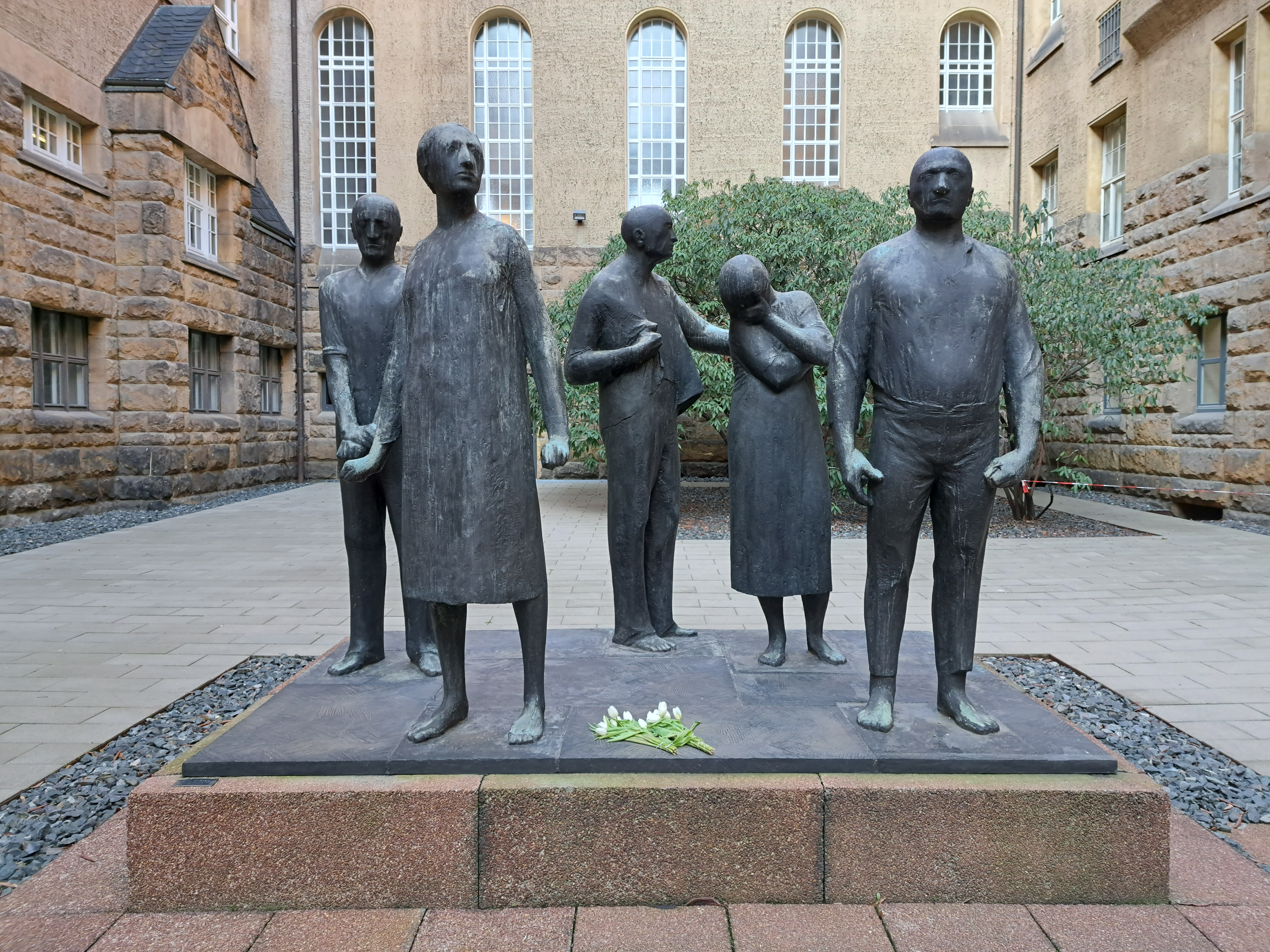
Memorial for executed resistance fighters in the backyard of the former court in Dresden

Since 1945, a main street in Leipzig, the highway leading towards Schkeuditz and Halle, part of Bundesstraße 6 has borne the name Georg-Schumann-Straße. From 1972 until 1991, a barracks of East Germany's National People's Army in Leipzig's Möckern neighbourhood bore the name Georg-Schumann-Kaserne. Also here was a memorial to Schumann, which has since been torn down. Still, there is a memorial for the whole resistance group at a cemetery, designed by Walter Arnold. There is a school in Leipzig which as of 2021 is still called Georg-Schumann-Schule. In 1976, the DDR issued a 10 Pfennig postage stamp in his honour.

The former court building where Georg Schumann was executed as well as a nearby street are still named after him. Today the Georg-Schumann-Bau is a university building of TU Dresden with a museum dedicated to victims of injustice during the Nazi regime and the GDR.

As a former Reichstag member, the Memorial to the Murdered Members of the Reichstag also commemorates him.
