= Kurt Kresse =

German resistance member

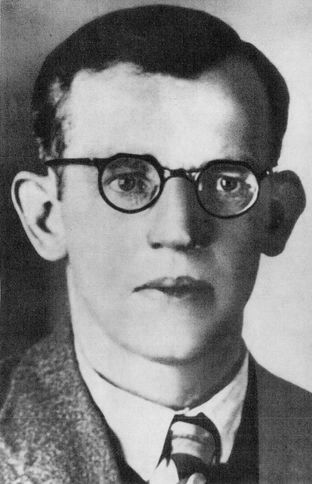
Kurt Kresse

Kurt Kresse (15 May 1904 – 11 January 1945) was a German communist and resistance fighter against Nazism.

== Biography ==
Kresse was born into a working-class family in Leipzig. In his youth, he worked as a miner and from 1924 onwards as a book printer. He joined the Young Communist League of Germany (KJVD) in 1920 and the Communist Party of Germany (KPD) in 1924. He served as member of the district leadership of the KPD in Western Saxony and as chairman of the workers' sports club "Fichte West" in Leipzig.

After the Nazi Party came to power in 1933, Kresse was arrested and spent time in prison and in Colditz concentration camp. After his release, he joined the resistance group around Georg Schumann. Kresse's tasks included rebuilding the underground KPD organization, making contacts with other anti-fascists and committing acts of sabotage against the war production.

On 19 June 1944, Kresse was arrested again. He was sentenced to death by the People's Court in Dresden on 21 November 1944, and executed by hanging on 11 January 1945 in Dresden together with fellow resistance fighters Georg Schumann and Otto Engert. After the fall of the Nazi regime, his remains were buried in the Südfriedhof.

A street in southwest Leipzig, Kurt-Kresse-Straße, was named after him in August 1945. A sporting field in Leipzig, Kurt-Kresse-Kampfbahn, also bears his name.
