= People of the Red Orchestra =

Participants in German resistance to Nazism

This is a list of participants, associates and helpers of, and certain infiltrators (such as Heinz Pannwitz) into, the Red Orchestra (German: Die Rote Kapelle) as it was known in Germany. Red Orchestra was the name given by the Abwehr to members of the German resistance to Nazism and anti-Nazi resistance movements in Allied or occupied countries during World War II. Many of the people on this list were arrested by the Abwehr or Gestapo. They were tried at the Nazi Imperial War Court before being executed either by hanging or guillotine, unless otherwise indicated. As the SS-Sonderkommando also took action against Soviet espionage networks within Switzerland, people who worked there are also included here.

== Group organisational diagrams ==
The following meticulously researched hierarchy diagrams were created by the Joint security service that consisted of the MI6 and the CIA between 1945 and 31 December 1949. In Germany, these were Soviet espionage organisations that grew out of the resistance groups.

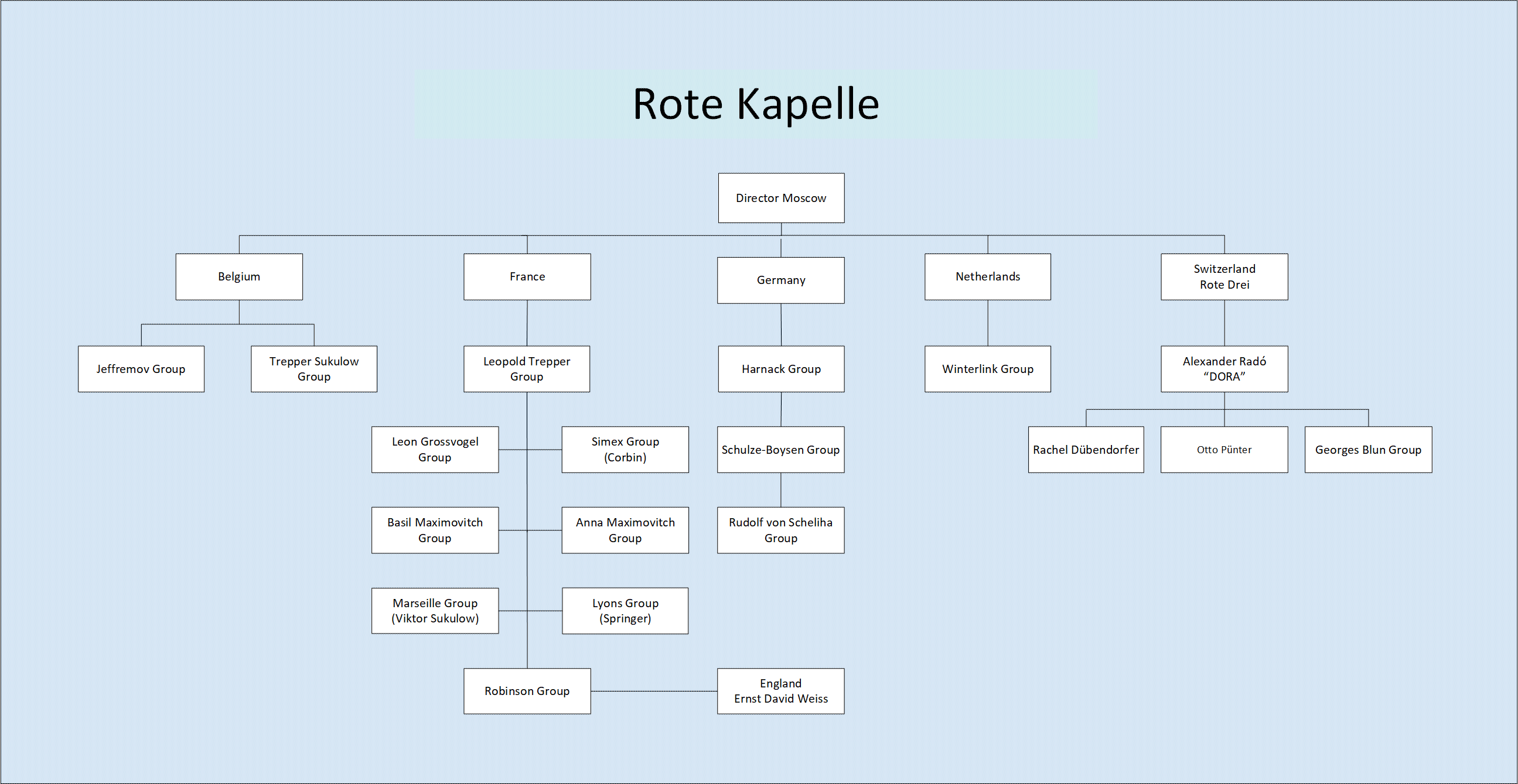
Overall organisational diagram of all anti-fascist and espionage groups by country

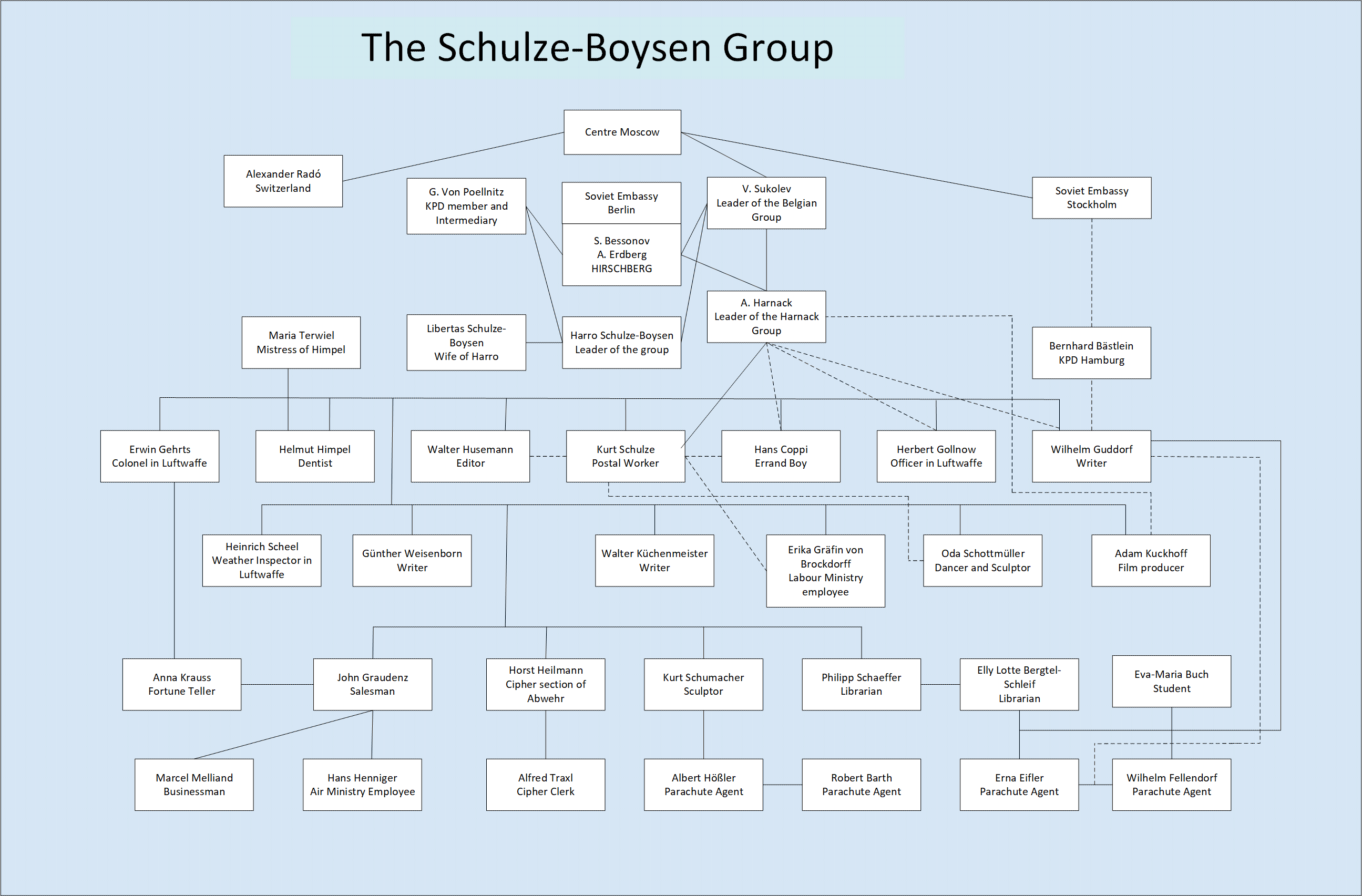
The Schulze-Boysen group in Germany

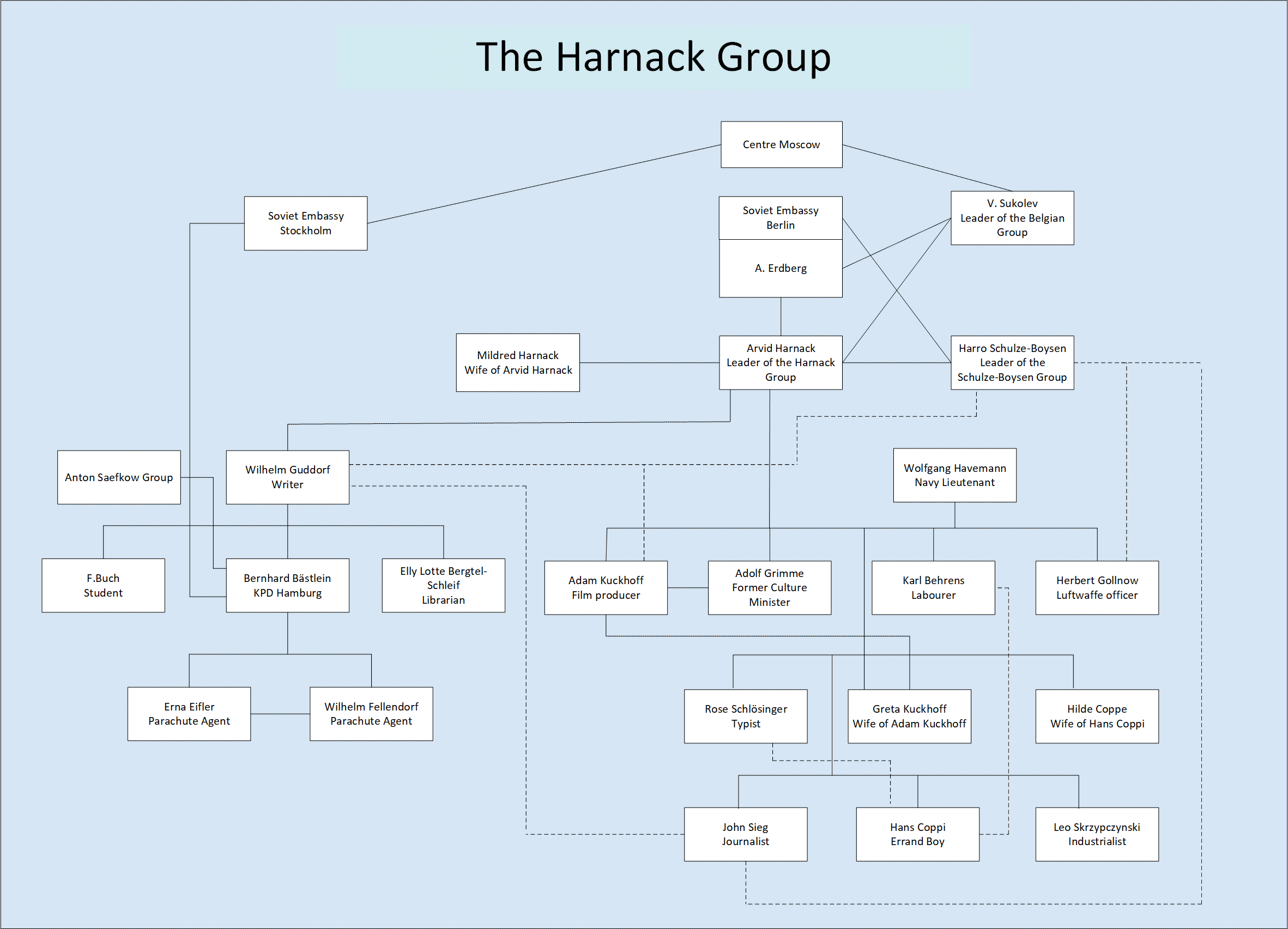
The Harnack group in Germany

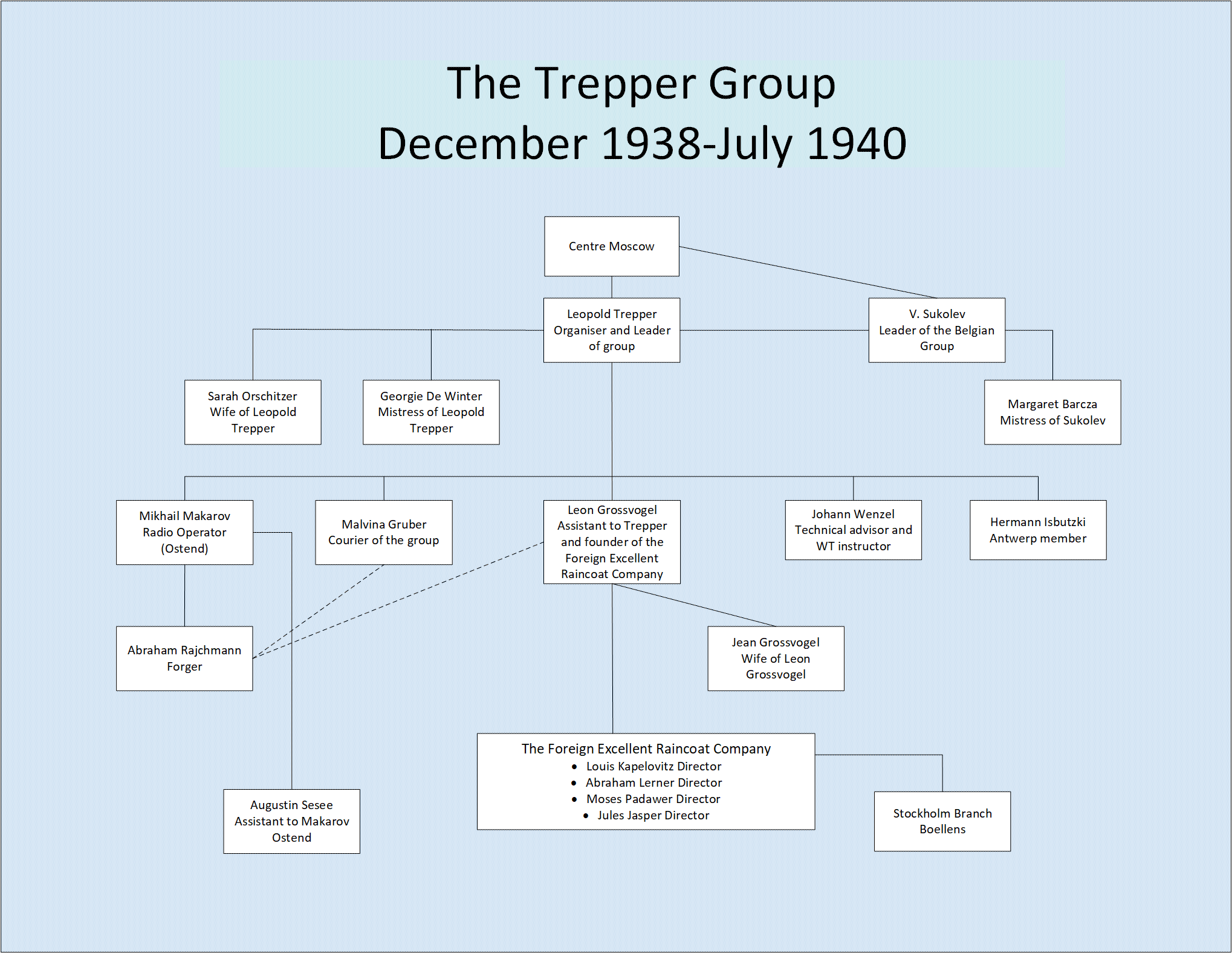
Diagram of the Trepper Group in Belgium

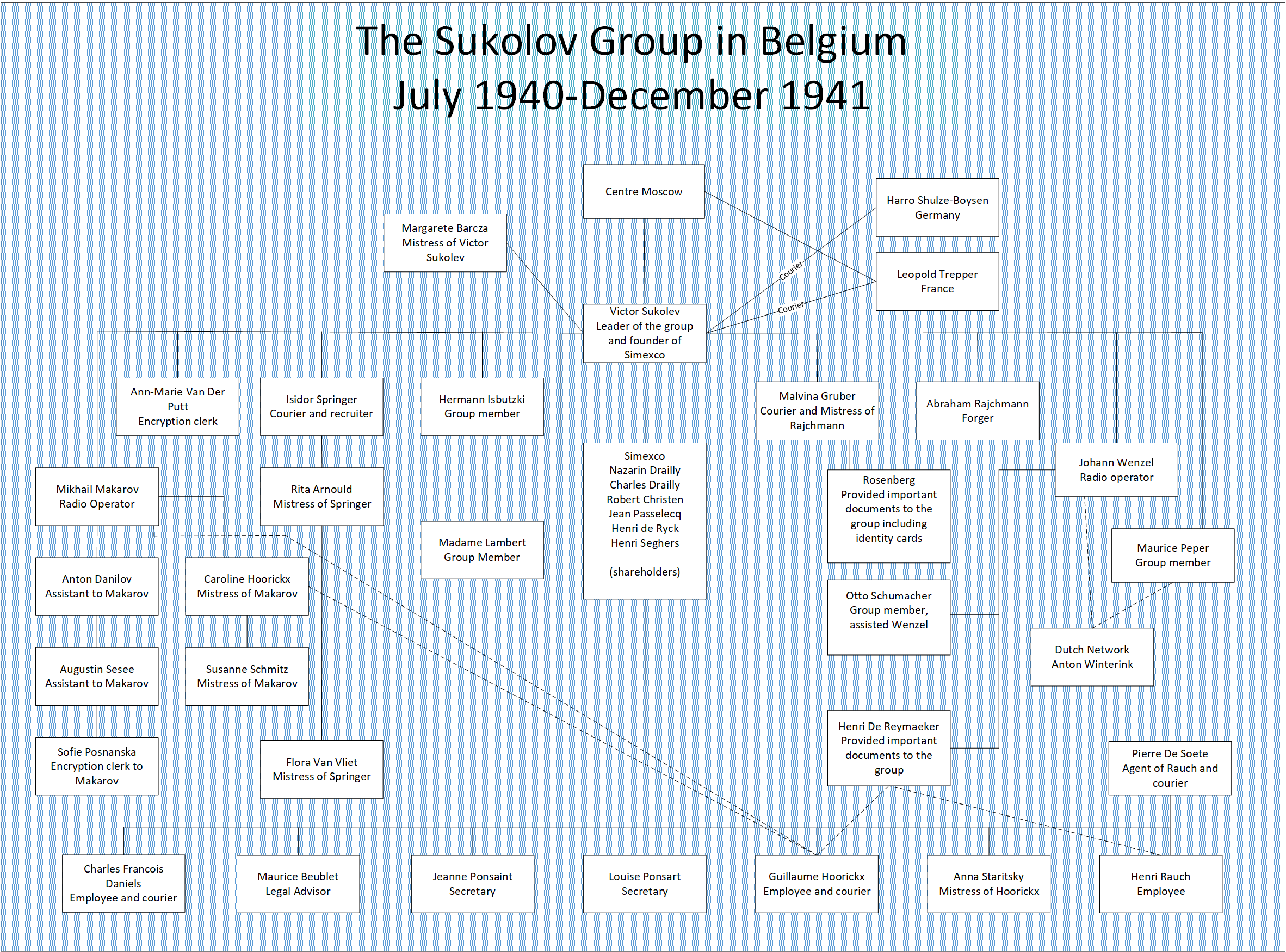
Gurevich group in Belgium between July 1940 to December 1941 in Belgium

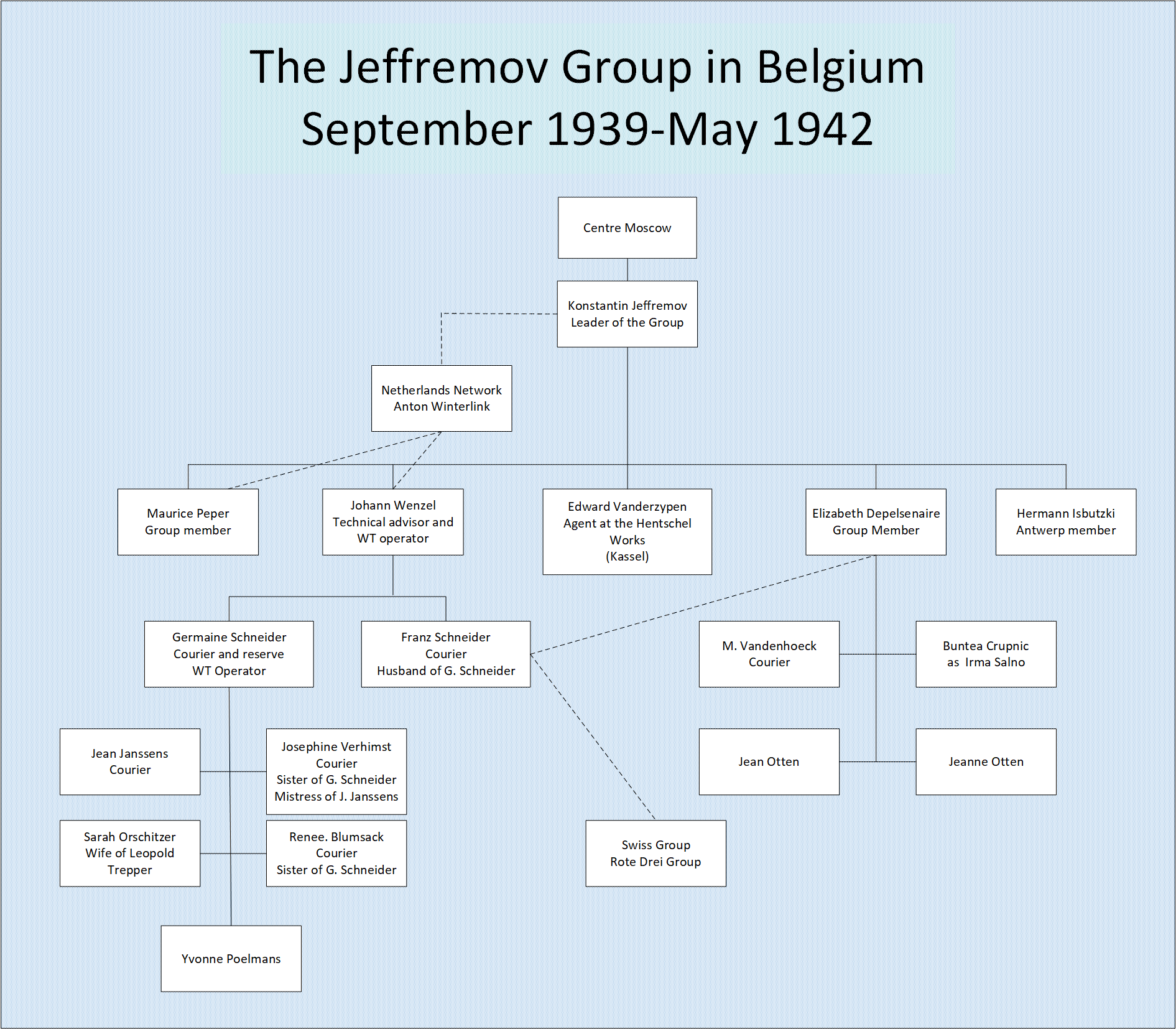
The Jeffremov Group, September 1939 - May 1942 in Belgium

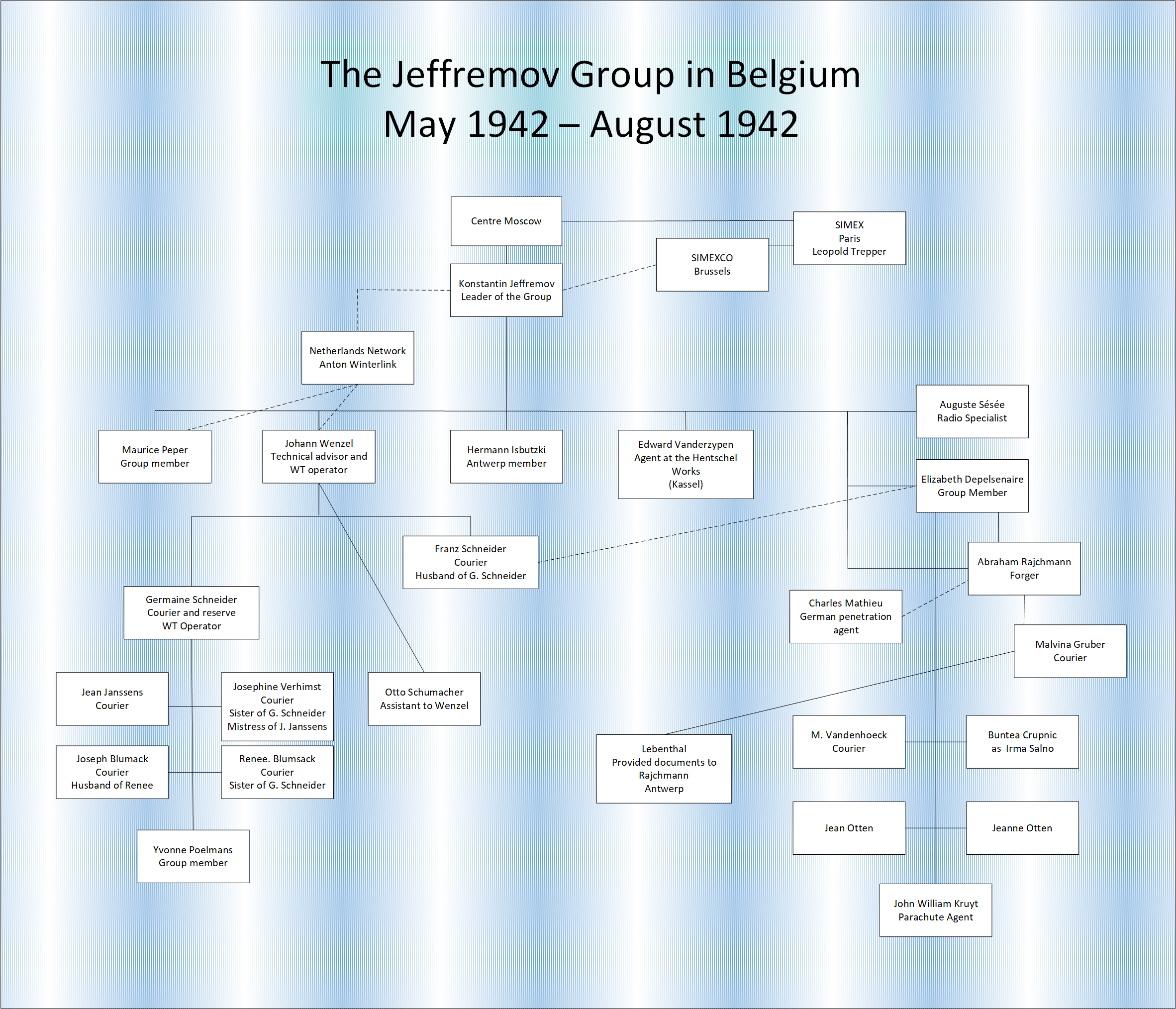
The Jeffremov Group, May 1942 - August 1942 in Belgium

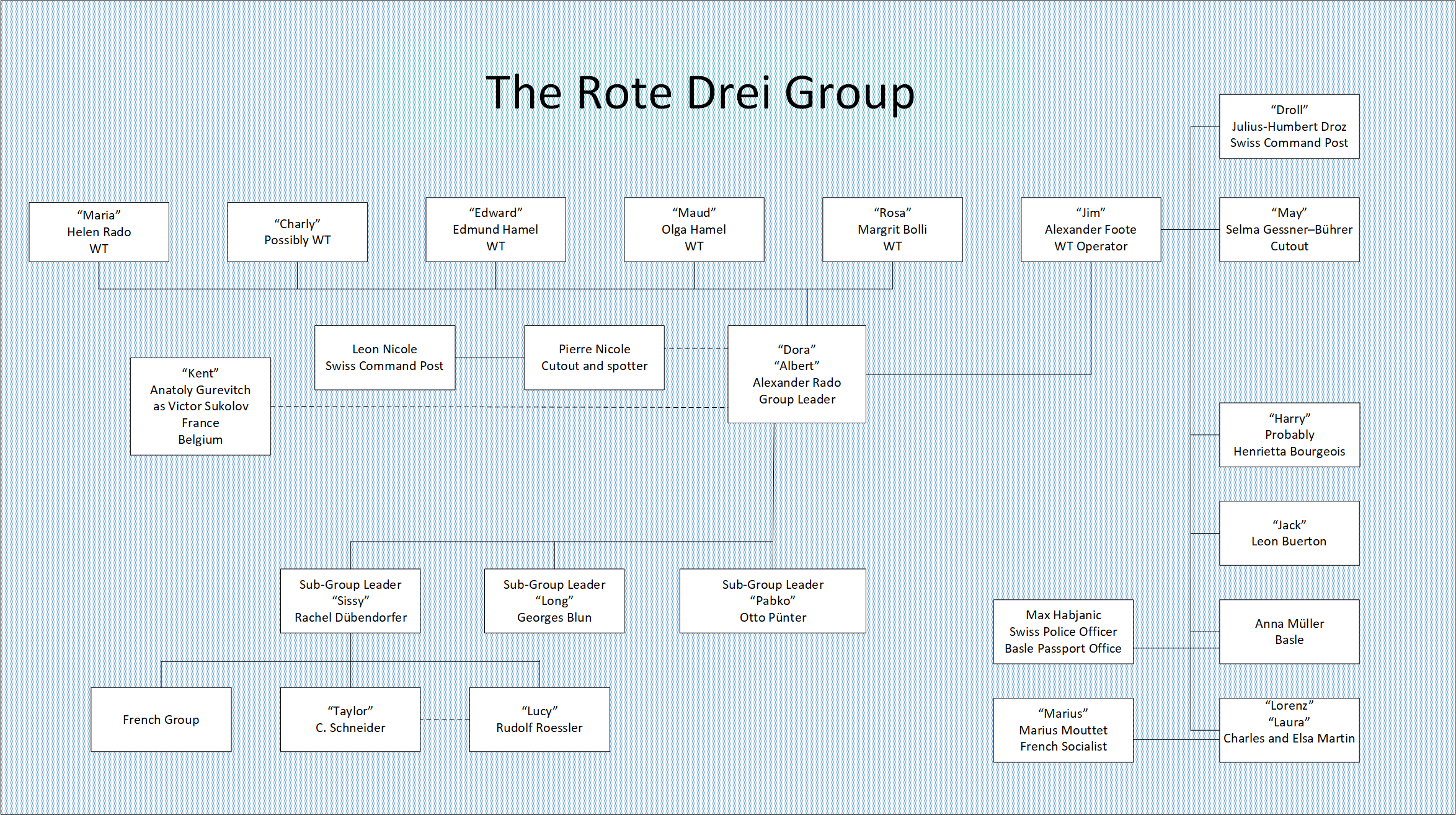
The Rote Drei Group in Switzerland

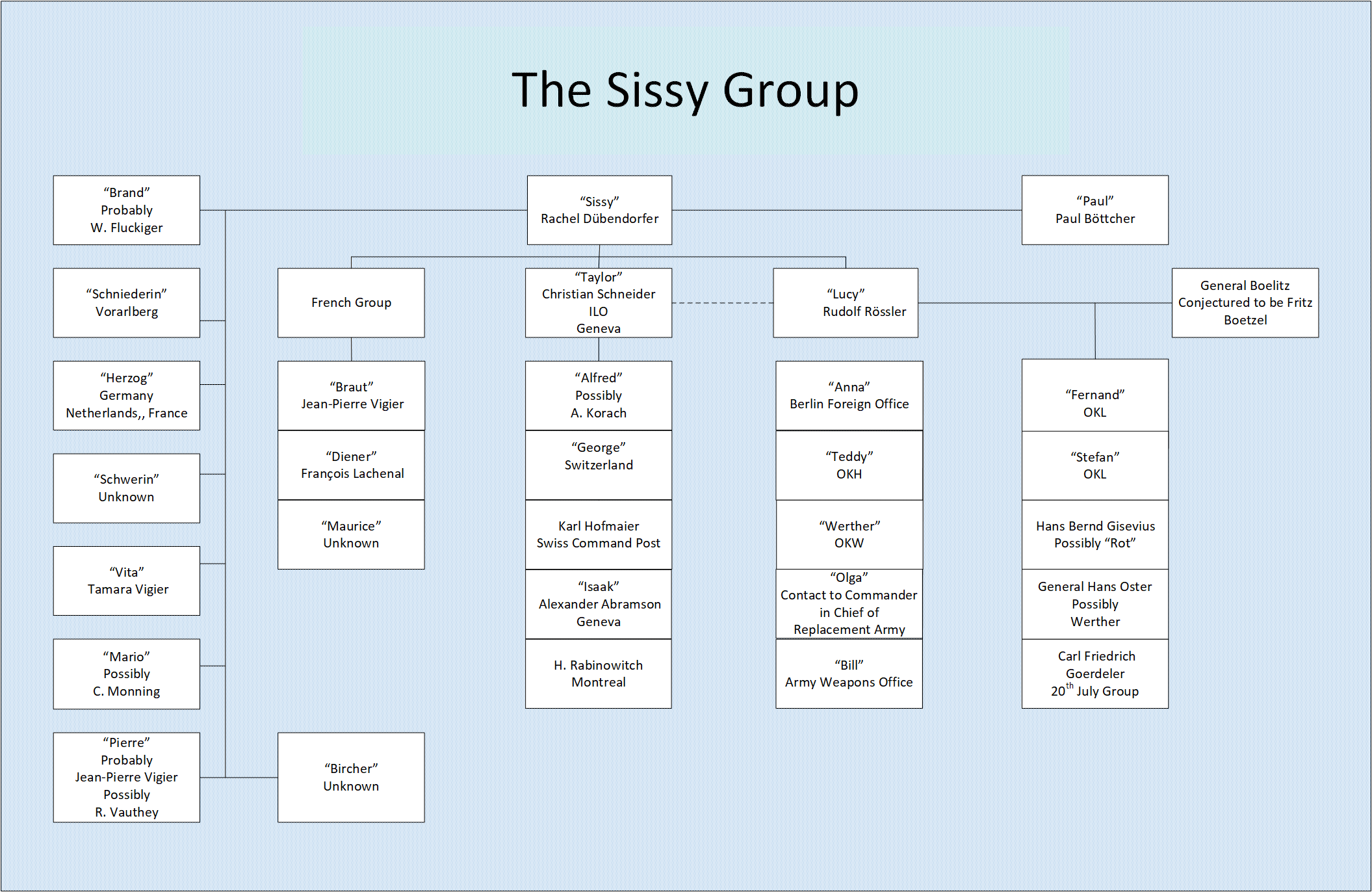
The "Sissy" Group in Switzerland. This group was run by Rachel Dübendorfer

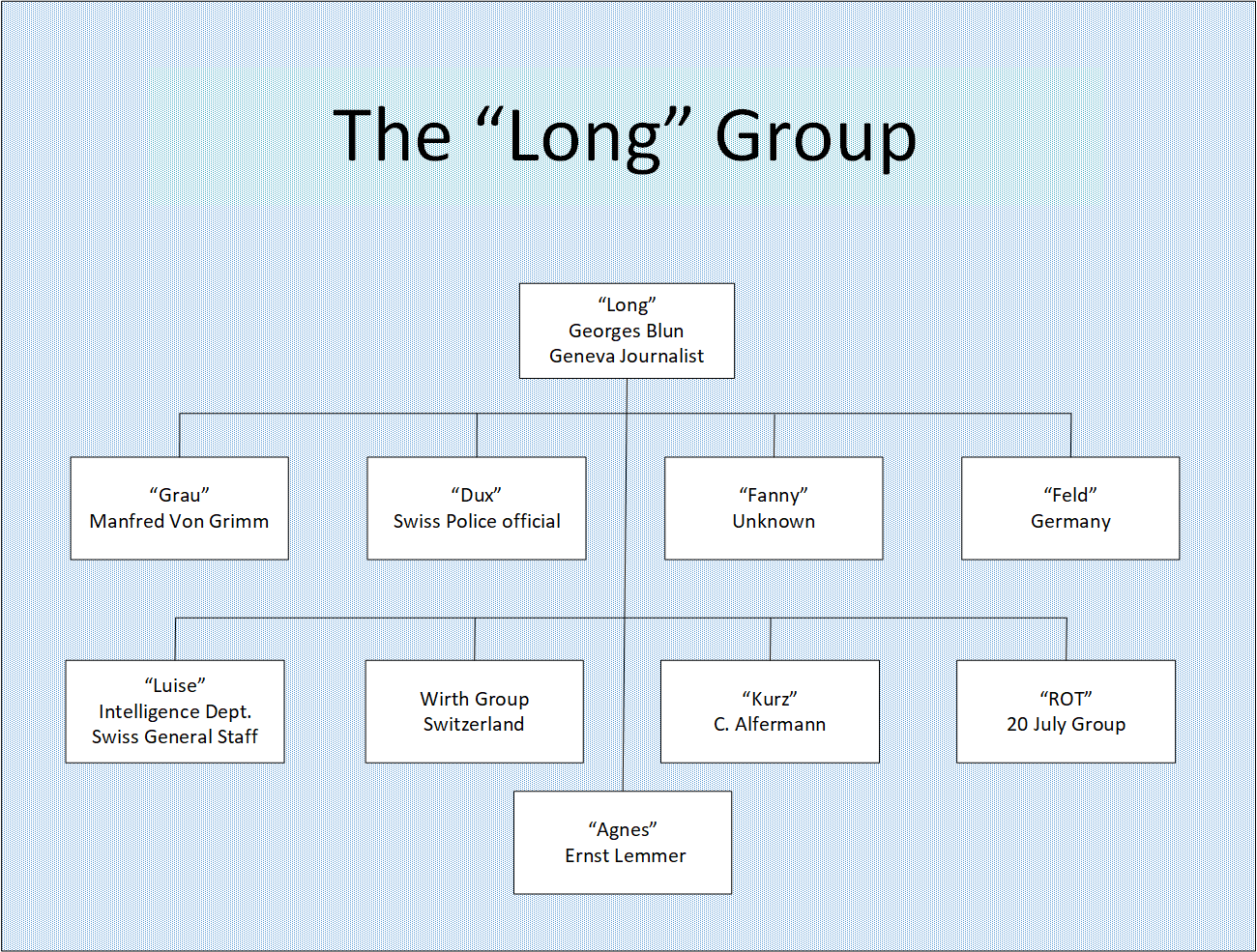
The organisation diagram of the "Long" group run by Georges Blun

The organisation diagram of the "Pakbo" group run by Otto Pünter

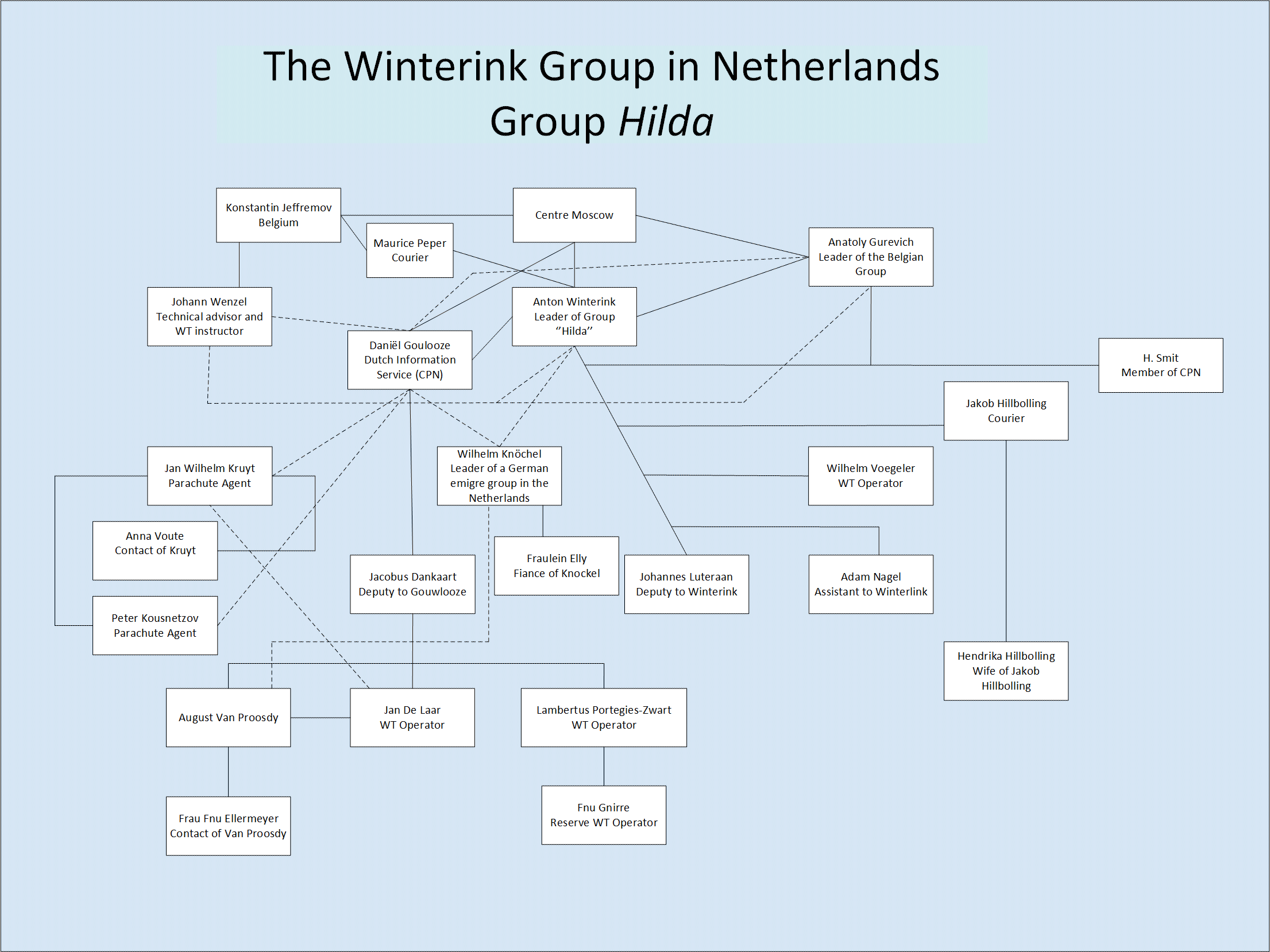
The Winterink Group in the Netherlands. It was also known as Group Hilda

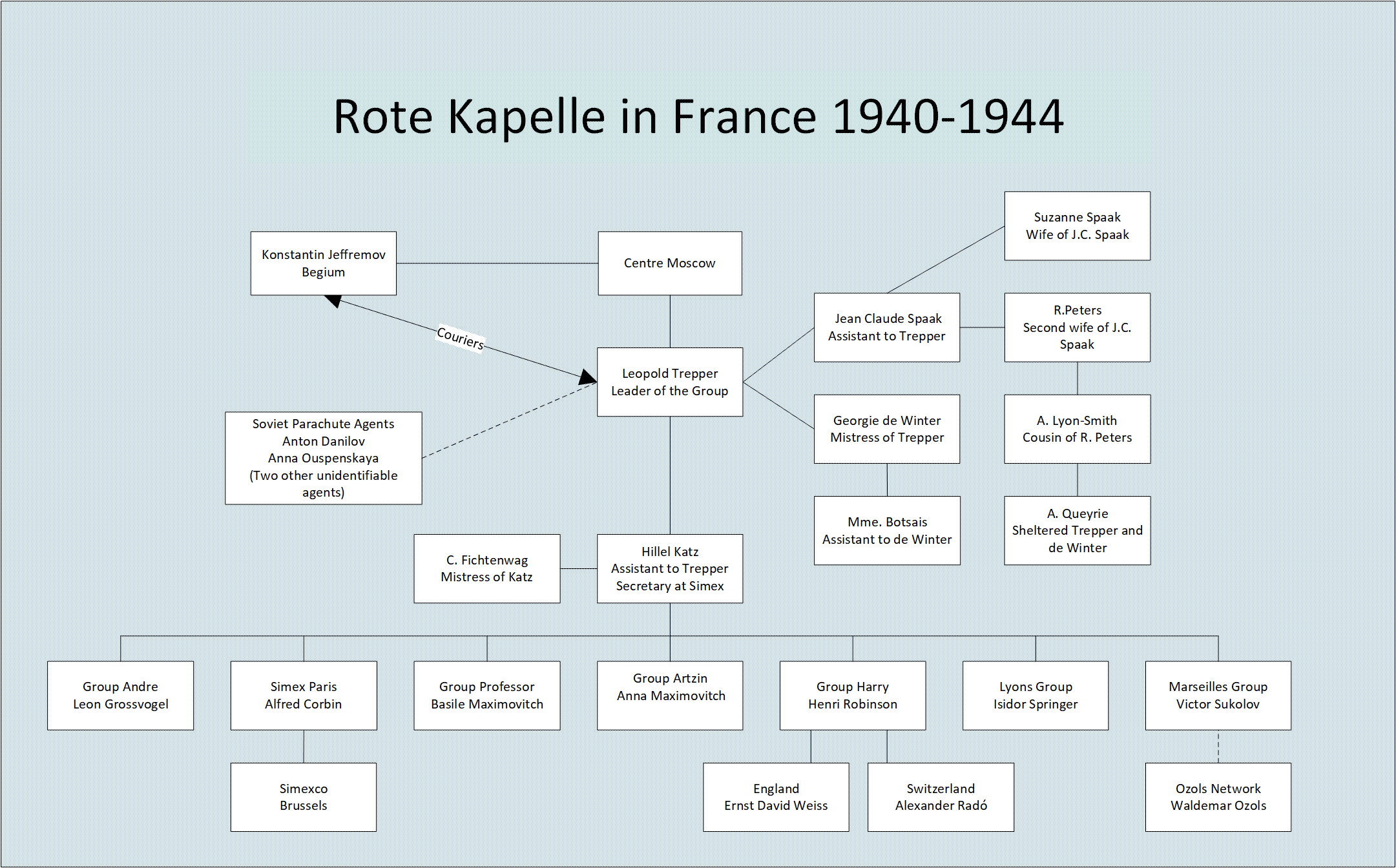
The Rote Kapelle in France between 1940 and 1944. This diagrams details the seven networks run by Leopold Trepper.

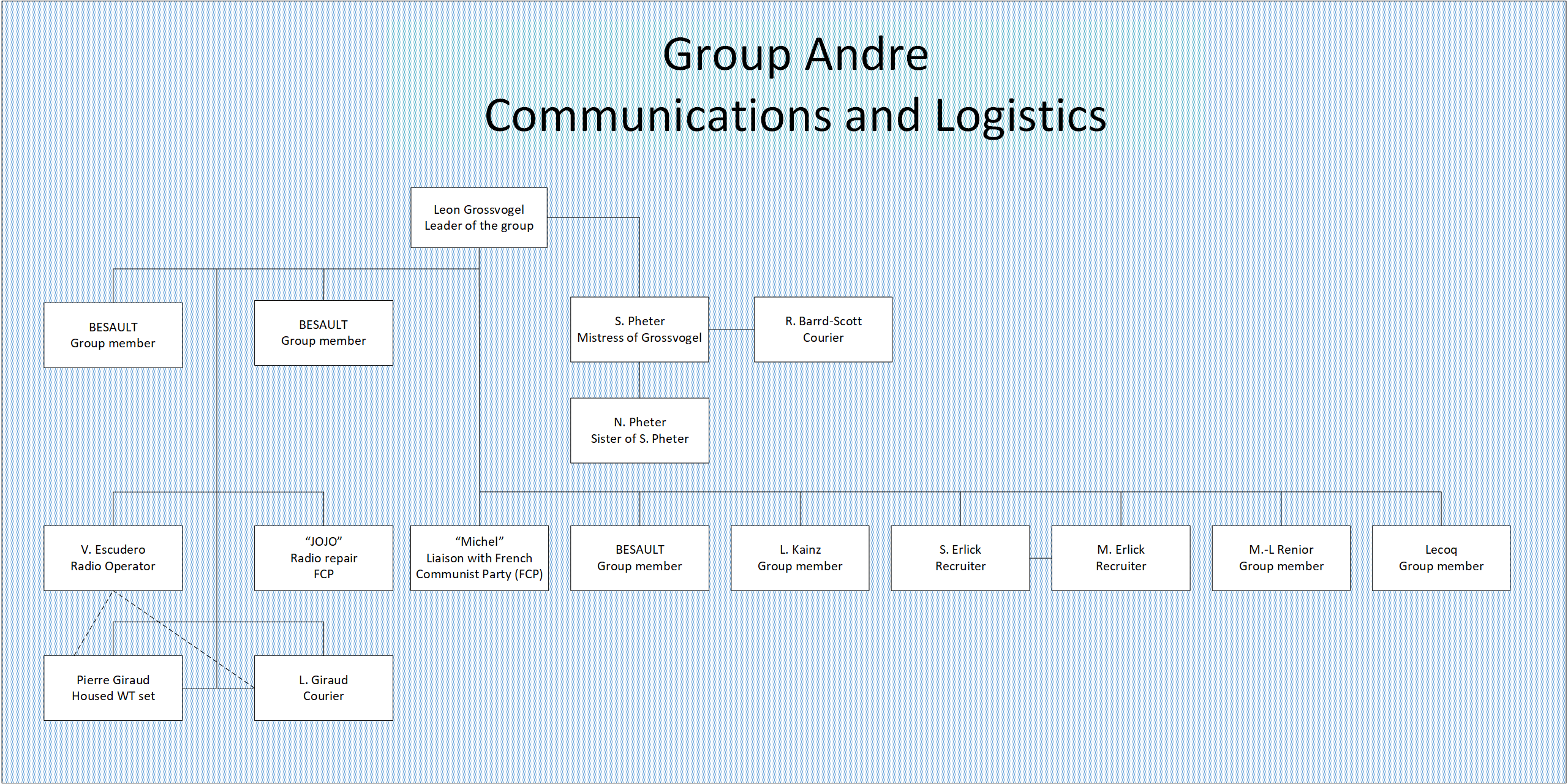
Group Andre was the 1st espionage group in Leopold Trepper organisation of seven groups. Its purpose was to gather industrial intelligence from enemy wireless communication networks

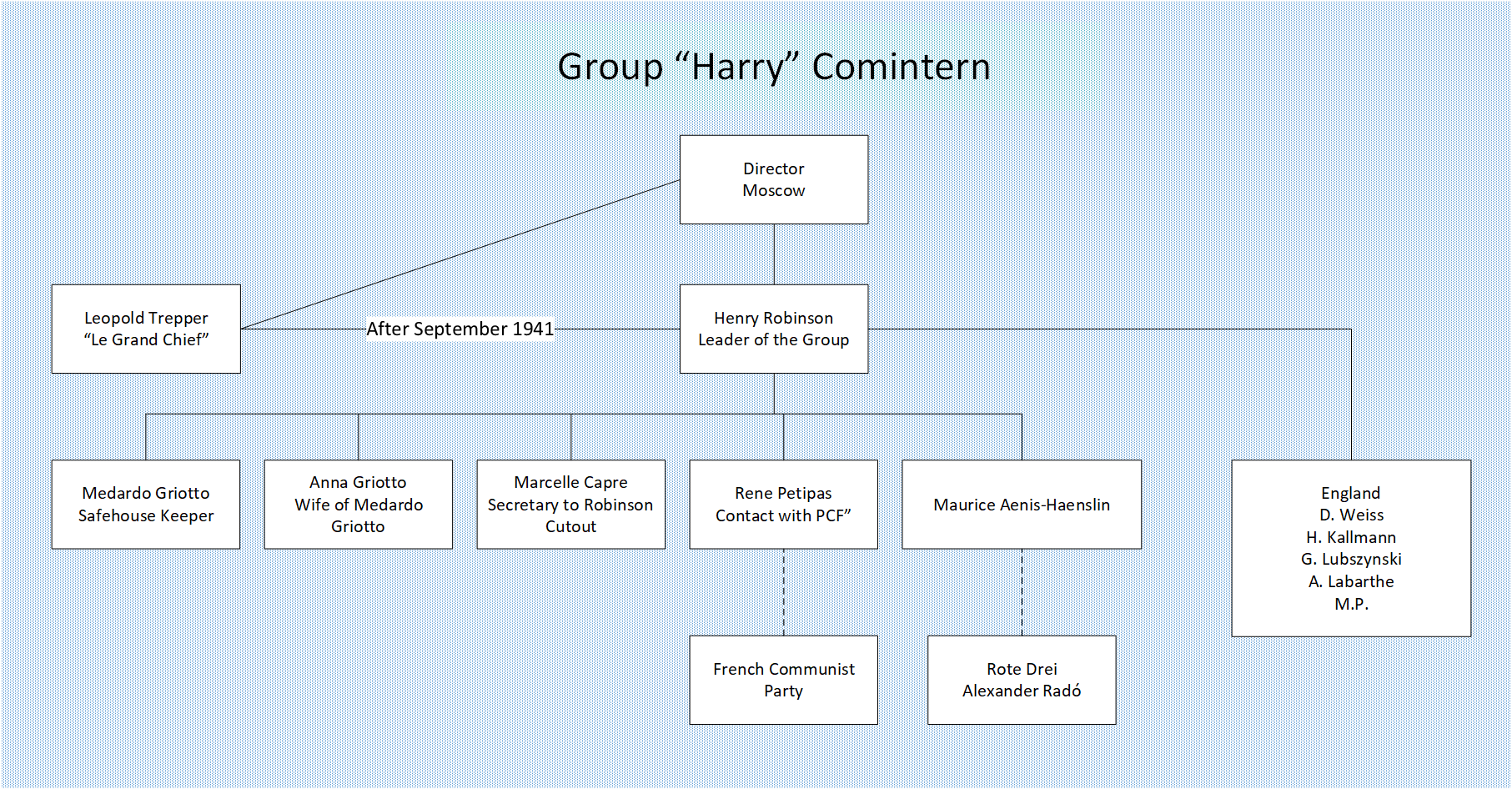
The Harry Group was the 2nd Group in Leopold Trepper's seven espionage networks. This group collected espionage secrets from French military and political circles, e.g. Vichy, Vichy intelligence Deuxième Bureau and Gaullist circles.

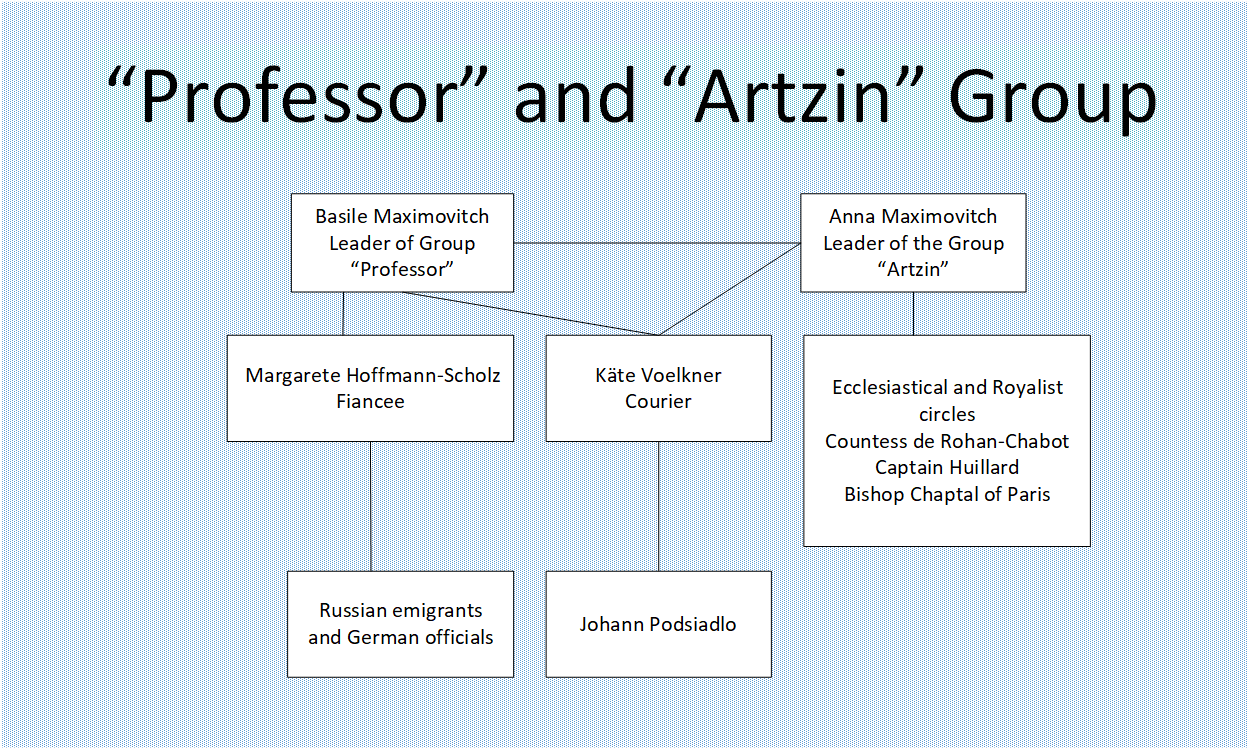
Organisation diagram of the "Professor" as the 3rd group in Leopold Trepper organisation of seven groups. Professor was the alias of Johann Wenzel. The "Artzin" group was the 4th group in the Trepper organisation and was run by Anna Maximovitch who collected intelligence from French clerical and royalist circles. The "Professor" group, run by Basile Maximovitch collected intelligence from German Wehrmacht and White Russian emigrant groups.

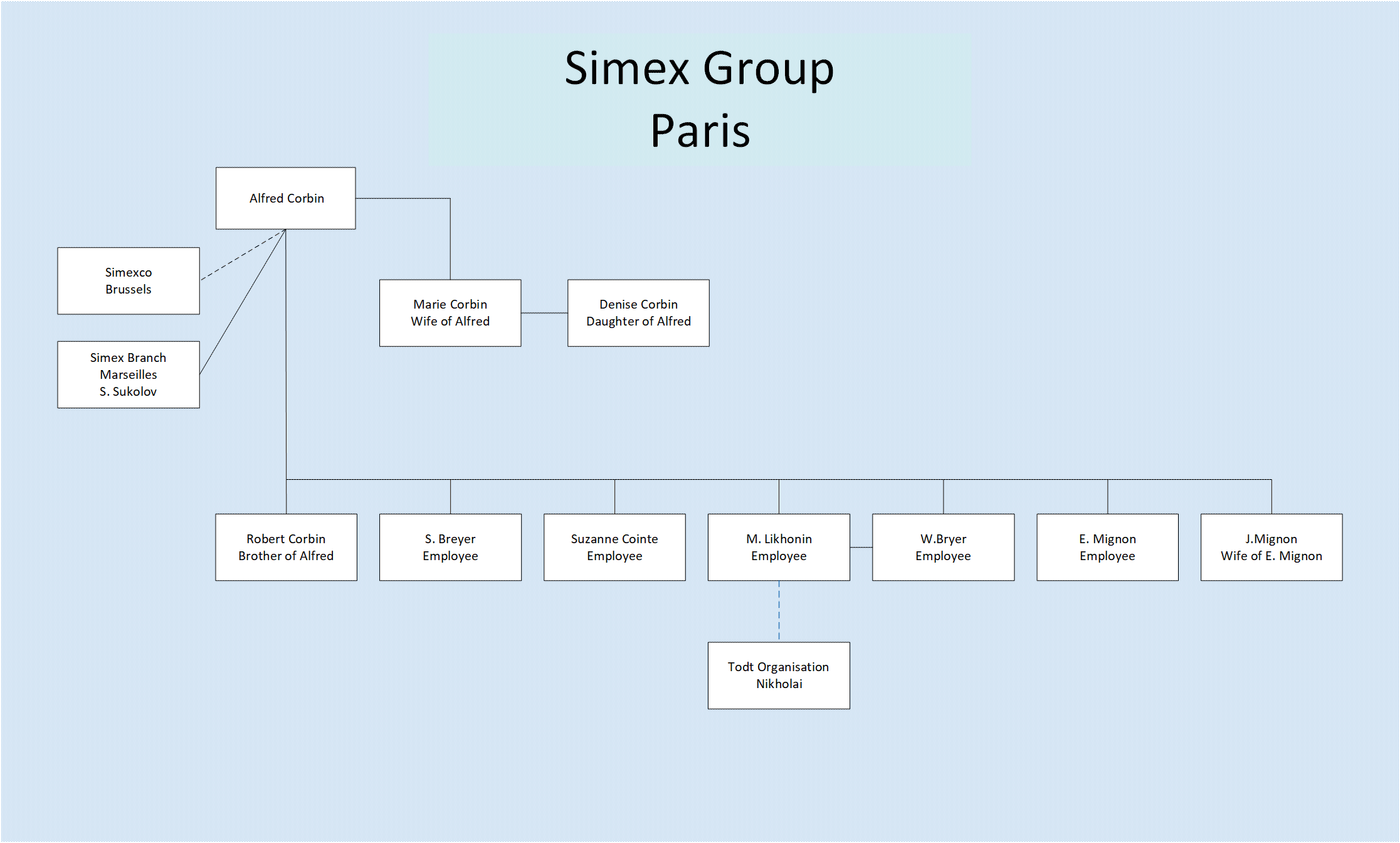
The Simex group was the 5th espionage group in Leopold Trepper organisation of seven groups. It managed finances and gathered intelligence from German firms and the German military

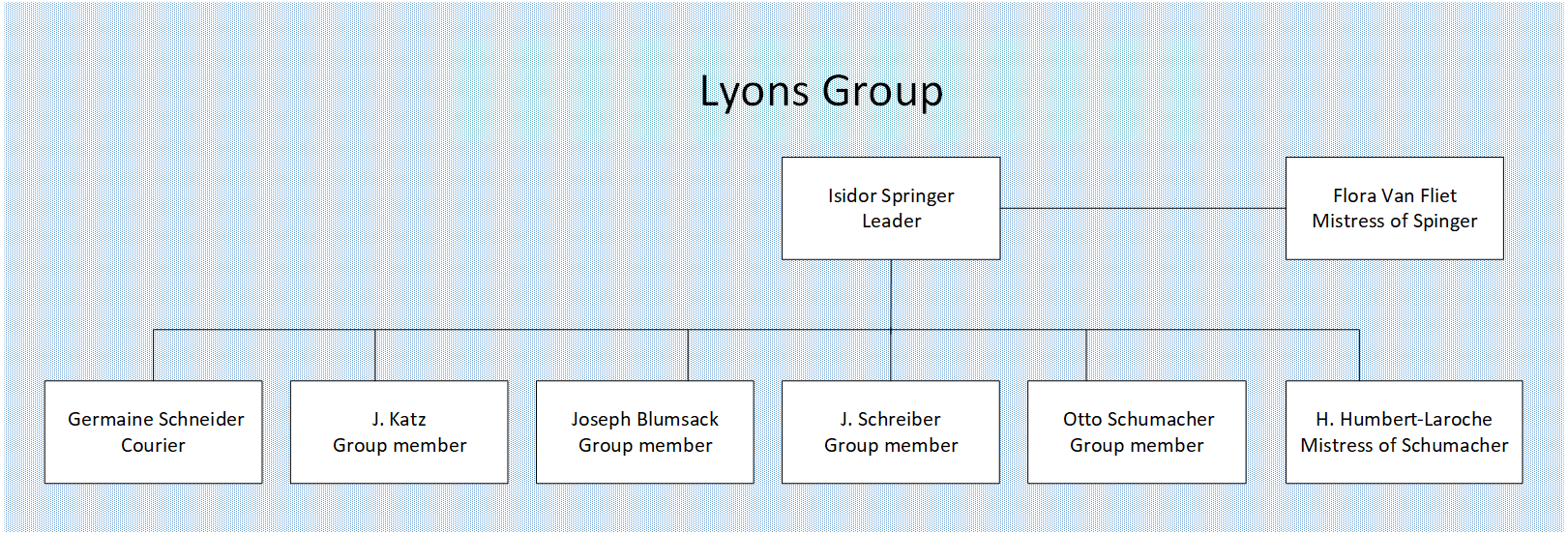
The Lyons or Romeo group was the 6th Group in Leopold Trepper's seven espionage networks. Its purpose was to collect intelligence from US and Belgian diplomats.

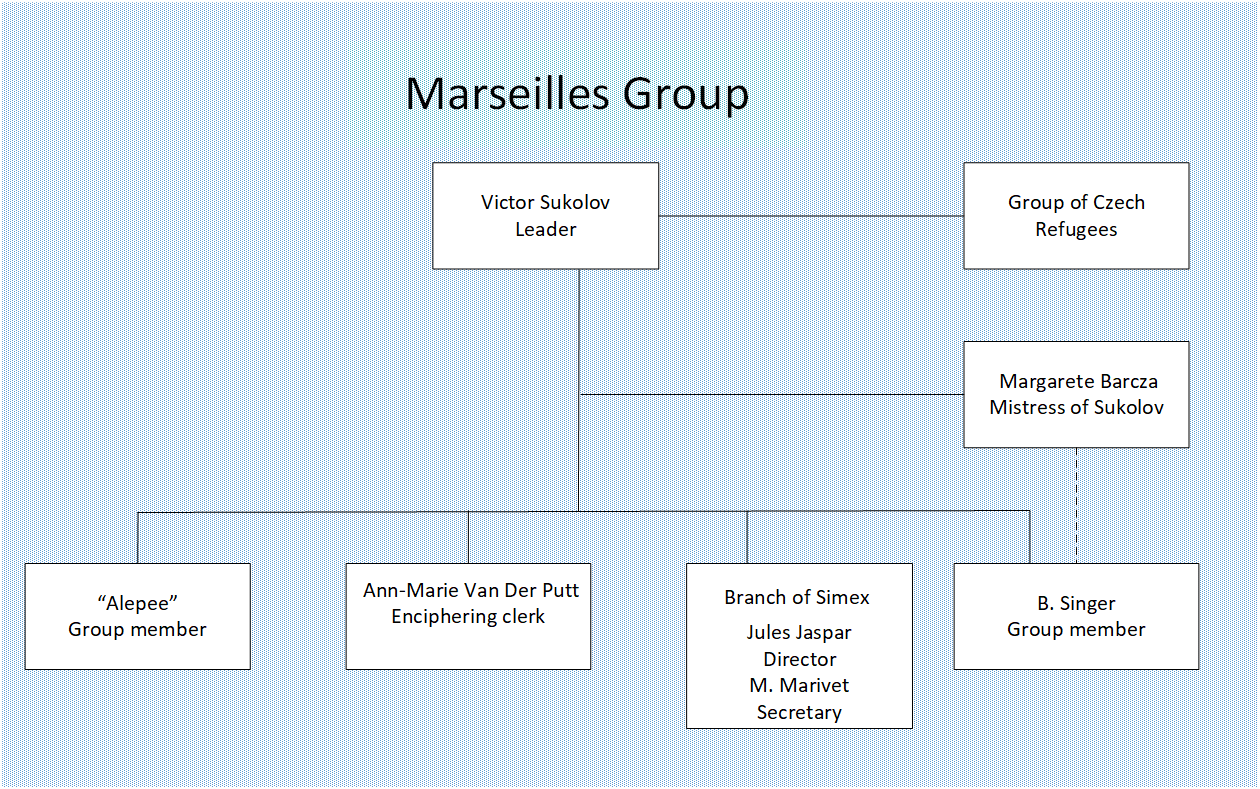
The 7th Group. In January 1942, Trepper ordered Anatoly Gurevich to travel to Marseille and establish a new branch office of Simex to enable the recruitment of a new espionage network.

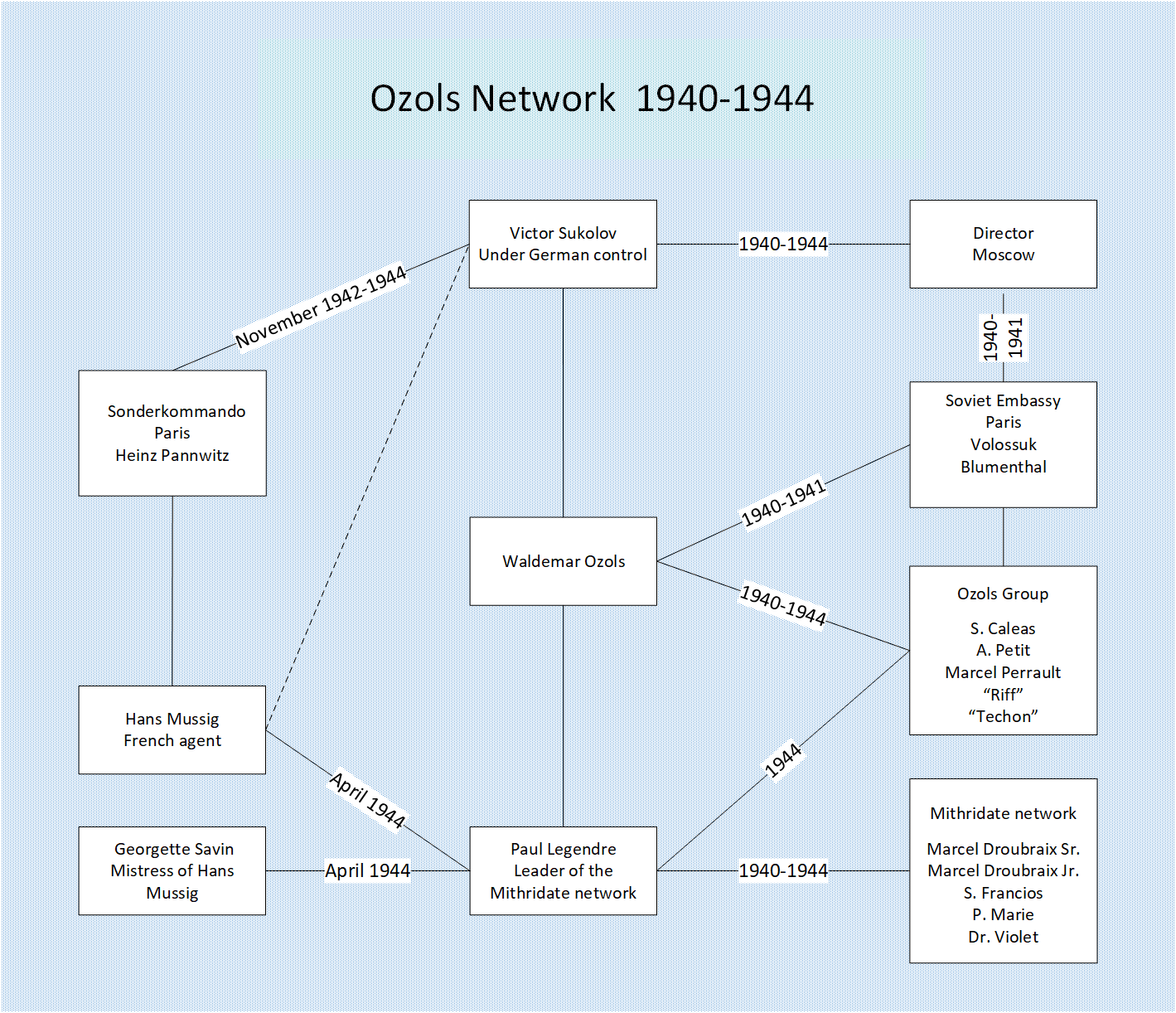
The Ozols and Mithridate were the final espionage network that was activated by Anatoly Gurevich after he and Trepper were captured by the Germans and Gurevich was forced to take part in a playback operation.

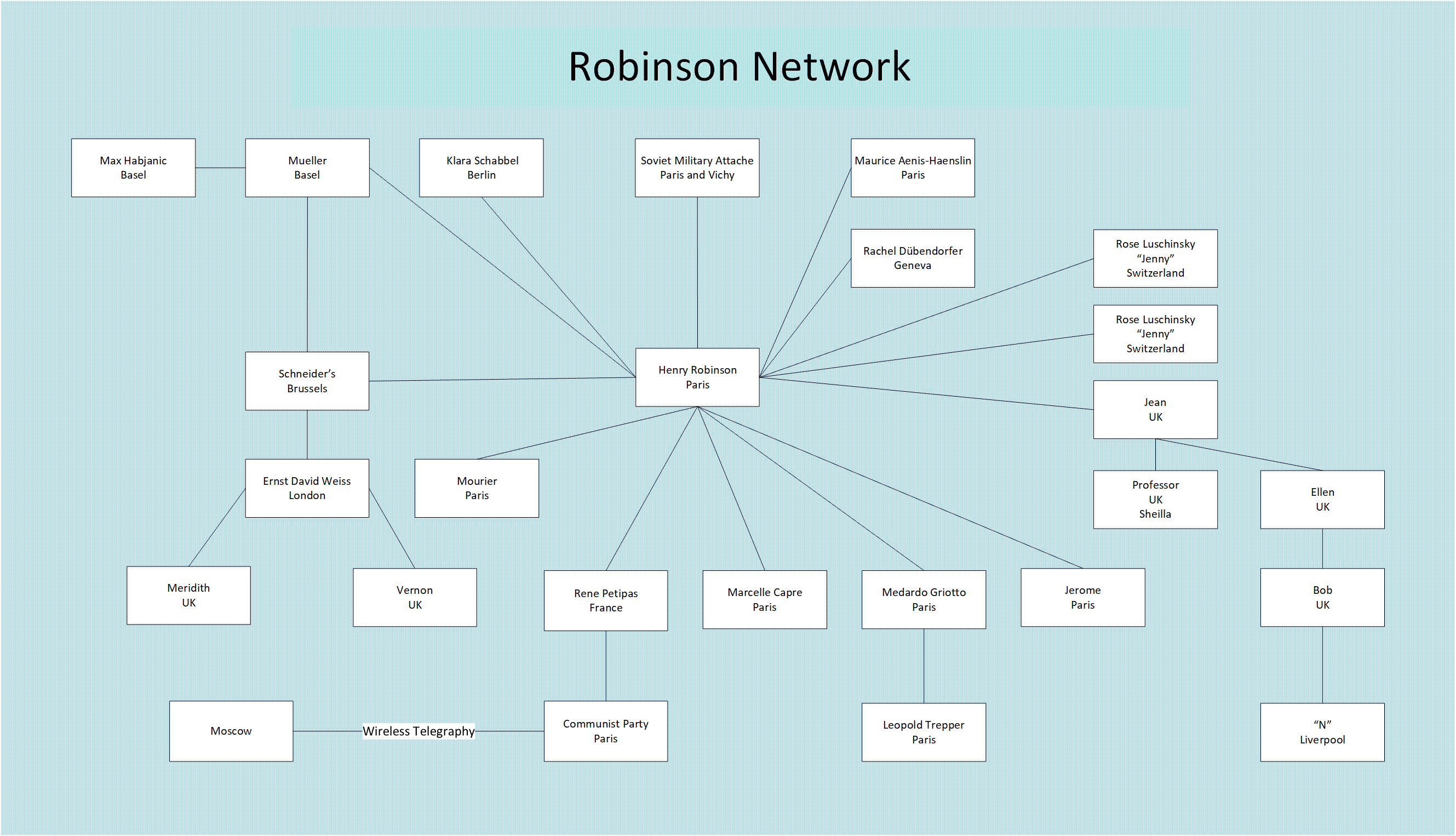
The French and UK espionage network of Henry Robinson that was taken over by Trepper in September 1941.

== Key ==
- If a person was associated with a group, then they are shaded.
- If they joined one group and left to join another, perhaps because the first group was disrupted, then the second group is detailed in notes and they are shaded based on the first group.
- If they worked for Soviet intelligence and built a group, then they are shaded as Soviet intelligence agents.

Country	Colour	Group	Colour	Group	Colour	Group	Colour	Group
Germany		Schulze-Boysen Group		Harnack Group		von Scheliha Group		Uhrig Group
		Bästlein-Jacob-Abshagen Group		Germany military including Gestapo, Funkabwehr				
Belgium		Trepper Group		Gurevich Group		Jeffremov Group September 1939-May 1942		Jeffremov Group May 1942-August 1942
Netherlands		Winterink Group or Group Hilda						
France		Group Andre		Lyons Group		Marseille Group		Ozols Network
Switzerland		Rote Drei Group		Sissy Group		Long Group		Pakbo Group
Soviet Union		Soviet intelligence officers						

== A ==
People of the Red Orchestra
Name	Life	Employment	Rote Kapelle or military position	Group	Arrested	Fate	Notes
Robert Abshagen	(1911–1944)	Insurance employee, sailor and construction worker	KPD member, Communist	Bästlein-Jacob-Abshagen Group	19 October 1942 in Hamburg	Sentenced to death by the Volksgerichtshof on 2 May 1944. Beheaded in Hamburg on July 10, 1944	The group that Abshagen was part of was created by Anton Saefkow and eventually held resistance cells in large Hamburg companies.
Alexander Abramson	(1896–?)	Lawyer and economist		Rote Drei			Codenames: Isaak and Sascha
Vera Ackermann		Militant communist	Encrypted communications prior to transmission and handed the ciphered text to the Sokols, who were radio operators, for transmission to the Soviets	Trepper Group		Escaped being arrested	(Partial Preview at Google Books)
Maurice Aenis-Haenslin			KPD member, liaison between Henry Robinson and Rachel Dübendorfer for the Rote Drei in Geneva	Rote Drei Group			Real person was never identified as name was identified through radio traffic. The name fitted two individuals but other facts didn't.
Bernhard Almstadt	(1897–1944)	Managing director of the Arbeiter-Sport-Verlag	KPD member. Courier, participated in the dissemination of the illegal paper, Die Innere Front (The Home Front).	Uhrig Group	12 July 1944 and sentenced to death on the 19th	Executed on 6 November 1944 in the Brandenburg-Görden penitentiary	
Leonid Abramovich Anulov	(1897–1974)	Soviet agent	Organizer of the Rote Drei in Switzerland			Recalled to the Soviet Union in 1938, received the Order of Lenin and released from office. He was then arrested under Soviet law § 436 and sentenced to 15 years at a work education detention camp.	
Rita Arnould	(1914–1943)	Housewife	Courier	Trepper Group	Rue des Atrebates 101, Brussels on 13 December 1941	Death sentence in April 1943	Rita Arnould (née Bloch) became an informer after being captured by the SS in Brussels. She betrayed the Gurevich group in Brussels, forcing many of its members to flee to France and other minor characters to stay hidden. Arnould was, nonetheless, executed on 20 August 1943 at Plötzensee Prison.

== B ==
People of the Red Orchestra
Name	Life	Employment	Rote Kapelle or military position	Group	Arrested	Fate	Notes
Otto Bach		Member of International Labour Office in Geneva	Facilitated introductions	Rote Drei			Member of the German Chamber of Commerce in Paris. Worked with Heinz Pannwitz.
Margarete Barcza	(1912–1985)						Mistress and later wife of Anatoly Gurevich.
Robert Barth	(1910–1945)	Typesetter	Communist and parachute agent	Schulze-Boysen Group	Arrested October 1942		Landed with Albert Hoessler
Bernhard Bästlein	(1894–1944)	Precision mechanic	KPD member, Communist. Built the Bästlein-Jacob-Abshagen Group.	Bästlein-Jacob-Abshagen Group	30 May 1944 and sentenced to death on 5 September	18 September 1944 beheaded with a hatchet	Linked to Harnack Group via Wilhelm Guddorf. Also linked to Schulze-Boysen and Uhrig people.
Arnold Bauer	(1909–2006)	Writer	Communist and KPD member	Schulze-Boysen Group		Survived the war	
Carl Baumann	(1912–1996)	Artist		Schulze-Boysen Group	Arrested in autumn 1942 and sent to the Eastern Front in 1943	Wounded in 1944 and captured by Soviet forces, but survived the war	Baumann created a now famous painting called Rote Kapelle 1941 ref number Inv-Nr. 1967 LM, now located in the Stadtmuseum in Münster in which he portrays Harro Schulze-Boysen, Walter Küchenmeister and Kurt Schumacher as architects building a bridge away from Nazism.
Anna Becker						11 August 1943 in the industrial yard of the Sachsenhausen concentration camp	Mother of Friedrich Beuthke's wife, Charlotte. Killed as one of the seven members by what the Nazi's called Sippenhaft, where they were inclined to kill the whole family in revenge, when a Red Orchestra member was discovered. Shot without trial.
Emil Becker						11 August 1943 in the industrial yard of the Sachsenhausen concentration camp	Father of Friedrich Beuthke's wife, Charlotte. Killed as one of the seven members by what the Nazis called Sippenhaft, where they were inclined to kill the whole family in revenge, when a Red Orchestra member was discovered.
Karl Behrens	(1909–1943)	Tool designer	Communist Black Front member, then member KPD	Harnack Group	16 September 1942. The 2nd senate of the Reichskriegsgericht announced on 18 January 1943, the death penalty	Killed on 13 May 1943 in Plötzensee Prison	
Clare Behrens	(1915–2011)	Tailor				Survived the war	Wife of Karl Behrens
Willy Berg		Gestapo Kriminalinspector	Sonderkommando Pannwitz. Monitored Trepper and Gurevitch.				Worked for Heinz Pannwitz
Helene Berger	(1898–?)	Austrian economist	Supplied intelligence to Rachel Dübendorfer	Rote Drei			
Hanna Berger (née Johanna Elisabeth Hochleitner-Köllchen)	(1910–1962)	Teacher, director, theatre director	Enabling subversive communist gatherings in her home. KPD member	Schulze-Boysen Group	1942, suspected of preparing to commit high treason and sentenced to two years in concentration camp, but was acquitted after several months on 21 August 1943	Survived the war	
Liane Berkowitz	(1923–1943)	Student	Took part in pamphleteering against The Soviet Paradise	Schulze-Boysen Group	Arrested on 26 September 1942. The 2nd senate of the Reichskriegsgericht announced on 20 January 1943, the death penalty	Executed on 20 January 1943 at Plötzensee Prison	
Sergei Bessonov	(1892–1941)	Foreign Intelligence Unit of the Soviet Embassy in Berlin		Created the Harro Schulze-Boysen Group.			Convinced Harnack to work for the Soviets. Murdered by the Soviet secret police in Stalin's Medvedev Forest massacre on 11 September 1941.
Maurice Beublet	(?–1943)	Belgian lawyer	Simexco legal advisor	Gurevich Group	4 December 1942 in Brussels	28 July 1943 in Plötzensee Prison	
Leon Beurton	(1914–1997)	Soviet agent	Chief cipher expert for Alexander Radó. Trained by Ursula Hamburger in WT procedures.	Rote Drei Group		Survived the war.	Married to Ursula Kuczynski. Codenamed William Miller, John, Fenton.
Anna Beuthke	(1883–1943)	Mother of the Beuthke family	KPD, Communist. Member of the Little Moscow garden colony. Also called Garden Friends.			Arrested 11 August 1943 in the industrial yard of the Sachsenhausen concentration camp.	Killed by what the Nazis called Sippenhaft, whereby they were inclined to kill the whole family in revenge whenever a Red Orchestra member was discovered. Shot without trial.
Ernst Beuthke	(1903–1943)	No profession, warehouse man. Only son of the Beuthke family who held no profession.	Communist KPD Anti-Fascist fighter in Spain, and Germany fighting the SA. Soviet parachutist.	Member of the Little Moscow garden colony. Also called Garden Friends. Hid in Charlotte Hundt's home upon arrival.	Arrested with his wife after returning from the USSR and exposing himself in the Little Moscow garden colony.	11 August 1943 in the industrial yard of the Sachsenhausen concentration camp	Killed by what the Nazis called Sippenhaft, whereby they were inclined to kill the whole family in revenge whenever a Red Orchestra member was discovered. Shot without trial.
Friedrich Beuthke	(1906–1943)	Welder. Youngest son of the Beuthke family.	KPD member, Communist. Member of the Little Moscow garden colony.			Executed on 11 August 1943 in the industrial yard of the Sachsenhausen concentration camp.	Killed by what the Nazis called Sippenhaft, whereby they were inclined to kill the whole family in revenge whenever a Red Orchestra member was discovered. Shot without trial.
Richard Beuthke	(1880–1943)	Servant and turner. Father of the Beuthke family.	KPD member, Communist. Member of the Little Moscow garden colony.			Executed on 11 August 1943 in the industrial yard of the Sachsenhausen concentration camp	Killed by what the Nazis called Sippenhaft, whereby they were inclined to kill the whole family in revenge whenever a Red Orchestra member was discovered. Shot without trial.
Walter Beuthke	(1904–1943)	Precision mechanic. Second eldest son of the Beuthke family.	KPD member, Communist. Member of the Little Moscow garden colony.			Executed on 11 August 1943 in the industrial yard of the Sachsenhausen concentration camp	Killed by what the Nazis called Sippenhaft, whereby they were inclined to kill the whole family in revenge whenever a Red Orchestra member was discovered. Shot without trial.
Charlotte Beuthke	(1909–1943)		Communist KPD member of the Little Moscow garden colony. Shot without trial.			Executed on 11 August 1943 in the industrial yard of the Sachsenhausen concentration camp.	Married to Walter Beuthke.
Mario Bianchi	(1909–?)	Physician, ear, nose and throat specialist	Kept a safehouse that hid a number of contacts. Later, hid Alexander and Helen Radó after Rote Drei was broken up.	Rote Drei		Survived the war	
Lotte Bischoff (née Charlotte Wielepp)	(1901–1994)	stenographer	KPD, participated in the dissemination of the illegal paper, Die Innere Front. SED functionary	Saefkov-Jacob-Bästlein Group		Survived the war	In contact with Wilhelm Knöchel, Robert Uhrig, and Kurt and Elisabeth Schumacher.
Kurt Bietzke	(1894–1943)	Painter	KPD co-founder. Procured illegal quarters, got passports, money and ration cards.	Tucholla group, Red Mountain Climbers	Sentenced to death by the People's Court (Germany) in July 1942	17 August 1943 in Plötzensee Prison.	
Herbert Bittcher	(1908–1944)	Foreman	SPD. Later became a communist and joined the KPD	Bästlein-Jacob-Abshagen Group	Arrested by Gestapo	On 1 January 1944 sentenced to death for the "preparation for high treason". Executed in January 1944 in the Brandenburg-Görden Prison	
Joseph Blumsack		Member of the foreign workers section of the Communist Party of Belgium	Courier between Brussels and Paris	Trepper Group	Arrested 7 January 1943 and deported to Germany.	Rumoured to have survived but no evidence of this.	Married to Renée Clais-Blumsack.
Georges Blun	(1893–1999)	French journalist from Le Monde	Soviet agent	Rote Drei Group.		Survived the war	Directed small Blun network of six people in Switzerland. Codename Long. Secrets offered by Blun could not match the quality of the Lucy secrets, but still a very important member of the Red Three Group. Survived the war.
Suzanne Boisson	(1918–?)		Courier	Gurevich Group.	13 December 1941	Unknown	
Karl Böhme	(1914–1943)	Commercial clerk	Tried to organise the repair of the radio located at Hans Coppi	Schulze-Boysen Group		Arrested on 23 October 1942 in Berlin. The 2nd Senate of the Reichskriegsgericht announced the death penalty on 30 January 1943 "for preparation for high treason in a unit with favorability of the enemy and for aiding espionage".	Wife Margarete Böhme was also picked up by the Gestapo and killed.
Anton Börner		Soviet intelligence agent	Soviet parachutist	KPD			Trained as an upholsterer. Captured by the Gestapo upon landing.
Wilhelm Bösch	Died 10 April 1945	Locksmith	Communist KPD member. Collected money and food for persecuted colleagues.	AEG turbine factory group	21 March 1945 sentenced to death by Berlin Superior court	Murdered in Plötzensee Prison on 10 April 1945	
Hermann Böse	(1871–1943)	Music teacher and conductor	Communist, KPD member	Bästlein-Jacob-Abshagen Group		Sent to the KZ Mißler concentration camp	
Paul Böttcher	(1891–1975)	Communist politician, MP, Journalist	Passed information between Christian Schneider and Alexander Radó	Rote Drei Group	1933 taken into 10 months protective custody by the Nazis, released and emigrated to Switzerland	Survived the war	Married to Rachel Dübendorfer. Codename Paul, codenamed Hans Saalbach.
Margrit Bolli	(1919–2017)	Dancer	Radio operator	Rote Drei	13 October 1943 and sentenced to 10 months in prison	Survived the war	Code name Rosa, Schatz-Bolli,Schwarz-Boili. Recruited by Alexander Radó and trained in Wireless Telegraphy by Alexander Foote.
Cato Bontjes van Beek	(1920–1943)	Artist.	Distributed illegal writings and leaflets	Schulze-Boysen Group	20 September 1942. The 2nd senate of the Reichskriegsgericht announced the death penalty on 18 January 1943	18 January 1943 sentenced to death for high treason and guillotined. A personal clemency to Hitler was refused.	Started opposing Hitler when she was 13 years old when she heard a broadcast from Hitler in 1933 in the one nation speech.
Mietje Bontjes van Beek	(1922–2012)	Artist and author		Schulze-Boysen Group		Survived the war	Not actively involved in the resistance. Occasionally took food and cigarettes along with her sister Cato to French forced labourers in Berlin.
Jan Bontjes van Beek	(1899–1969)	Ceramist and sculptor		Schulze-Boysen Group	20 September 1942 in Berlin	Survived the war	Became famous sculptor and ceramist after the war, with a particular focus on vases. Fringe member of the group through his daughter Cato
Henriette Bourgeois	(1917–?)	stenographer	Radio operator	Rote Drei Group		Survived the war	Codename Harry
Elsa Boysen	(1883–1963)			Schulze-Boysen Group	26 September 1942	Survived the war	Aunt of Harro Schulze-Boysen.
Walter Bremer	(1904–1995)	Surveying student and Police officer	Helped produce the Die Innere Front newspaper			Survived the war	
Robert Breyer		Painter and illustrator		Trepper Group	25 November 1942 in Paris	Hanged in July 1943 in Plötzensee Prison	
Cay-Hugo Graf von Brockdorff	(1915–1999)	Sculptor		Schulze-Boysen group	Arrested in 1943 on the Eastern Front and sent to a Strafbataillon	Survived the war and married resistance fighter Eva Lippold. Marie Hübner was maid of honor.	
Erika Gräfin von Brockdorff	(1911–1943)	Office worker	Radio experimenter, used own house as communication centre for Hans Coppi	Schulze-Boysen Group	16 September 1942 arrested and sentenced to 10 years. The 2nd senate of the Reichskriegsgericht sentenced him on 21 April 1943 to four years in prison for preparation for high treason. Hitler turned penalty into death sentence.	13 May 1943, strangled with a rope attached to a meathook in Plötzensee Prison	
Eva-Maria Buch	(1921–1943)	Interpreter, translator, bookseller and student	Translation of individual pamphlets and the Die Innere Front newspaper into French	Schulze-Boysen Group	Arrested on 11 October 1942	On 3 February 1943 sentenced by the 2nd Reichskriegsgericht to death for the preparation of a high-treasonous enterprise and because of enemy favouritism and executed in Plötzensee Prison.	
Walter Budeus	(1902–1944)	Machinist	Communist, former KPD member. Built illegal group in northern Berlin to report armaments production and to disseminate leaflets.	Uhrig Group	February 1942	21 August 1944 beheaded	
Hugo Buschmann	(1899–1983)	Industrialist. President of the Eternit AG, a construction materials company.	Worked as an informant for Schulze-Boysen	Schulze-Boysen Group		Survived the war	Travelled as Leo Buschmann

== C ==
People of the Red Orchestra
Name	Life	Employment	Rote Kapelle or military position	Group	Arrested	Fate	Notes
Marcelle Capre	(1914–?)	Soviet intelligence officer	Acted as a cutout for agent Jerome. Provided intelligence on French aircraft.	Trepper Group			Code name Martha. Hid Germaine Schneider in her apartment. Assistant to Henry Robinson.
Robert Jean Christen	(1898–?)			Gurevich Group	25 November 1942 in Brussels	Survived the war	Simexco shareholder
Joséphine Clais	(?–1945)		Courier	Jeffremov Group	January 1943 and sent to Breendonk prison camp	Died in early 1945 in Ravensbrück concentration camp	Married name Joséphine Verhimst. Sister of Germaine Schneider and Reneé Clais. Recruited by Germaine.
Reneé Clais (Blumsack)	(1907–1945)	Courier between Brussels and Paris		Trepper Group	Arrested on 7 January 1943 in Brussels	10 March 1945 in the Mauthausen concentration camp	Wife of Joseph Blumsack. Sister of Germaine Schneider and Joséphine Clais. Recruited by Germaine.
Suzanne Cointe	(1905–1943)	Piano teacher. Secretary to Alfred Corbin at Simex		Trepper Group	19 November 1942 in Paris	July 1943 in Plötzensee Prison	
Frieda Coppi		Tailor		Harnack Group	12 September 1942 in Berlin		Mother of Hans Coppi. Killed by what the Nazis called Sippenhaft, whereby they were inclined to kill the entire family of any Red Orchestra member who was uncovered.
Hans Coppi	(1916–1942)	Student	Distributing pamphlets, later establishing a radio link to the Soviet Union	Harnack group	Arrested on 12 September 1942 in Berlin. On 19 December 1942, the 3rd Senate of the Reichskriegsgericht announced the death penalty	Death penalty 19 December 1942	Introduced to Schulze-Boysen via Heinrich Scheel. Ran the Coro group. Code name Strahlmann.
Hilde Coppi	(1909–1943)	Clerk	KPD	Harnack Group	12 September 1942 in Berlin. On 20 January 1943, the 2nd senate of the Reichskriegsgericht pronounced the death penalty.	Death penalty on 20 January 1943	Wife of Hans Coppi. Mother of Hans Coppi Jr. (born 27 November 1942)
Kurt Coppi				Harnack Group	12 September 1942 in Berlin		
Robert Coppi	(1882–1960)	Painter specialising in lacquer and gilding	KPD	Harnack Group	12 September 1942		Father of Hans Coppi. Killed by what the Nazis called Sippenhaft, whereby they were inclined to kill the entire family of any Red Orchestra member who was uncovered.
Alfred Corbin	(1919–1943)	French commercial director	Ran the 5th Trepper sub-network. Managing director of Simex in Paris. Courier	Trepper Group	19 November 1942 in Paris	28 July 1943 in Plötzensee Prison	Initially never knew anything about the network but was gradually drawn in over many months, eventually becoming a core member.
Denise Corbin					25 November 1942	Fresnes Prison	Wife of Robert Corbin. Killed by what the Nazis called Sippenhaft, whereby they were inclined to kill the entire family of any Red Orchestra member who was uncovered.
Marie Corbin					26 November 1942	Ravensbrück concentration camp.	Killed by what the Nazis called Sippenhaft, whereby they were inclined to kill the entire family of any Red Orchestra member who was uncovered.
Robert Corbin			Liaison between Alfred Corbin and the Organisation Todt	Trepper Group	19 November 1942 in Paris	8 March 1943 death penalty	Denise Corbin was his wife. Brother of Alfred Corbin. uncovered.
Fritz Cremer	(1906–1993)	Sculptor. Soldier between 1940 and 1944.	KPD member, Communist	Schulze-Boysen Group		Survived the war	Husband of Hanna Berger, who, although arrested as part of Schulze-Boysen group, escaped in 1944. Both Cremer and Berger survived the war. Cremer had strong contacts with Walter Küchenmeister and Kurt Schumacher
Buntea Crupnic	(1911–2002)	Lawyer	Communist. Provisioned safehouses in the Brussels area and responsible to Elizabeth Depelsenaire.	Jeffremov Group		Survived the war	Code name Irma Salno, Irene Sadnow, Andree, Yvonne

== D ==
People of the Red Orchestra
Name	Life	Employment	Rote Kapelle or military position	Group	Arrested	Fate	Notes
Charles Francois Daniels	(1911–?)	Businessman	Courier between Simexco in Brussels and Simex in Paris	Gurevich Group			Business associate of Guillaume Hoorickx and Heinrich Rauch.
Anton Danilov		Belgian communist, Soviet agent	Secret writing specialist to prepare identity papers	Gurevich Group	12 December 1941 in Brussels while transmitting	Believed to have been executed in or around 1943.	Code name: Antonio, Desmet, de Smet, de Smith Assistant to Anton Makarov. Assumed to be David Kamy in disguise.
Elizabeth Depelsenaire	(1913–1998)	Lawyer, feminist	Belgian Communist, Intelligence officer	Jeffremov Group	Arrested July 1942	Survived the war	Worked in the group in 1941 and 1942.
Werner Dissel	(1912–2003)	Actor	Volunteered into the Wehrmacht to betray them.	Schulze-Boysen group	Escaped detection	Survived the war	Helped to publish the magazine of the Schulze-Boysen Group called The Adversary. Was a personnel friend of Harro Schulze-Boysen.
Rachel Dobrik	(1908–?)	Rote Drei accountant	Supplied monies to Rachel Dübendorfer from an American account	Rote Drei			Dobrik warned Alexander Radó that the Swiss were going to arrest Rote Drei members.
Martha Dodd	(1908–1990)	Writer	Soviet agent	Harnack group		Survived the war	
Charles Drailly	(1901–1945)	Banker and commercial expert	Became director of Simexco in March 1941.	Gurevich Group then worked for the Rote Drei	Arrested on 25 November 1942	Died of Typhus on 4 January 1945 Mauthausen concentration camp	Drailly was aware of the activities of the Belgian intelligence networks but did not actively take part in them.
Germaine Drailly	(1899–1945)			Rote Drei	Arrested 26 November 1942 and deported to Berlin	On 13 May 1945, sentenced to death by the Reichskriegsgericht.	Married to Nazarin Drailly.
Nazarin Drailly	(1900–1943)	Helped to establish Simexco	Took over management of Simexco after Gurevich left for France.	Gurevich Group, Rote Drei	6 January 1943 Brussels.	Tortured with dogs who ripped his legs to shreds and they had to be amputated. 28 July 1943 in Plötzensee Prison	Brother of Charles Drailly. Actively involved in the collection of military and industrial intelligence.
Solange Drailly	(born 1 February 1926)			Rote Drei	Arrested as part of the Simexco round up by the Gestapo in November 1942.	Released for lack of evidence. Survived the war.	Daughter of Nazarin and Germaine Drailly.
Rachel Dübendorfer	(1900–1973)	Secretary of International Labour Organization	Polish Comintern representative	Rote Drei		Survived the war.	Code name was Sissy.
Jutta Dubinsky	(1917–1985)		KPD/SED	Wilhelm Schürmann-Horster group and later Hans Coppi group	21 October 1942 in Berlin	The 2nd senate of the People's Court sentenced on 21 August 1943 to eight years in prison. Survived the war.	Became involved with Harnack through the Fritz Cremer, Cay-Hugo von Brockdorff and Wolfgang Thiess.
Viktor Dubinsky	(1912–1942)	Student	KPD/SED	Wilhelm Schürmann-Horster group and later Hans Coppi group	26 October 1942 in Guben	21 April 1943 sentenced to five years in prison for preparation of High Treason.	Became involved with Harnack through the Fritz Cremer, Cay-Hugo von Brockdorff and Wolfgang Thiess.
Jacques Duclos	(1896–1975)	French Communist politician	PKF, Coordinator of the Resistance. Managed connections to Moscow	Trepper group		Survived the war	

== E ==
People of the Red Orchestra
Name	Life	Employment	Rote Kapelle or military position	Group	Arrested	Fate	Notes
Modeste Ehrlich				Trepper Group	December 1942	Sent to a concentration camp	Betrayed by Trepper to save his life.
Erna Eifler	(1908–1944)	Stenographer	Soviet parachutist	KPD, Communist agent	Arrested on 15 October 1942 in Hamburg	On 8 April or 7 June 1944 shot dead in Ravensbrück concentration camp	Arrived in Germany with Wilhelm Fellendorf in May 1942 and were to provide communication for the von Scheliha group but Harnack heard of their arrival in Hamburg.
Charlotte Eisenblätter	(1903–1944)	Chief secretary in a large company	Creating leaflets and writing addresses.	Uhrig group	Arrested in February 1942, she was sent to Ravensbrück concentration camp	On the 10 July 1944, sentenced to death for preparing for high treason	
Horst von Einsiedel	(1905–1947)	Lawyer and economist		Kreisau group			Worked with Arvid Harnack in the 1930s to build a resistance group.
Ina Ender	(1917–2008)	Seamstress andmodel	Courier	Schulze-Boysen and Harnack Groups through Hans Coppi who ran the Coro Group	Arrested September 1942	In July 1943 sentenced to six years in prison by the Reichskriegsgericht for assisting to disintegrate the military forces (distributing leaflets). Ender survived the war	Communicated gossip from the couturier shop she worked in that was attended by Eve Braun, to Schulze-Boysen. Married Hans Lautenschläger on 14 September 1936. In December 1952, she married civil servant Siegfried Ender,
Alexander Erdberg	(1909–1961)	Soviet intelligence agent.	Acted as contact between Moscow and Harnack Schulze-Boysen Groups	Recruited Harnack Group, Created Schulze-Boysen Group		Survived the war	Worked for the Foreign Intelligence Unit of the Soviet Embassy in Berlin.

== F ==
People of the Red Orchestra
Name	Life	Employment	Rote Kapelle or military position	Group	Arrested	Fate	Notes
Katharina Fellendorf	(1884–1944)	Housewife					Mother of Wilhelm Fellendorf. Killed by what the Nazis called Sippenhaft, where they were inclined to kill the entire family of any Red Orchestra member who was uncovered.
Wilhelm Fellendorf	(1903–1944)	Locksmith, driver	Soviet agent	Schulze-Boysen and Bästlein-Jacob-Abshagen group	15 October 1942	28 October 1942 in Hamburg	Came to Germany in May 1942 with Erna Eifler as a parachutist to collect intelligence.
Wilhem Franz Flicke	(1897–1957)	German Wehrmacht soldier and cryptanalyst, later author	Worked on the cryptanalysis of Rote Drei messages	Cipher Department of the High Command of the Wehrmacht (OKW/Chi)			Flicke wrote two books. The second one was called War Secrets in the Ether that described an OKW/Chi intercept station at Lauf. The first and most salient book was on the subject of the Die Rote Kapelle. The information is no longer considered fully accurate and is at times, misleading.
Alexander Foote	(1905–1957)	Radio operator	Radio operator	Rote Drei Group	In November 1943 imprisoned by Swiss who picked up his radio by DF-ing it. Released September 1944	Survived the war	Code names:Jim, Alfred, Major Granatow, Alfred Feodorovich Capidus, Alexander Alexandrovich Dymov, John South, Albert Mueller. Worked with Ursula Beurton then Alexander Radó. Had many code names.
Karl Frank	(1906–1944)	Cabinetmaker and politician	KPD member, produced papers and pamphlets attacking the Nazi regime, calling for acts of resistance.	Uhrig Group	Arrested in May 1942 and in June 1944, sent to the Sachsenhausen and Landsberg concentration camps.	Executed on August 21, 1944 at the Brandenburg-Görden Prison.	Frank was in the communist group that created resistance cells in factories around Berlin and Hamburg. The cells were coordinated by Robert Uhrig.

== G ==
People of the Red Orchestra
Name	Life	Employment	Rote Kapelle or military position	Group	Arrested	Fate	Notes
Erwin Gehrts	(1890–1943)	Journalist, Colonel in Luftwaffe	Communist, Gehrts passed all his Luftwaffe documents and interesting events to Shulze-Boysen who passed some to Harnack	Shulze-Boysen Group	9 October 1942	Reichskriegsgericht announced death penalty 10 January 1943	One of the most important members of the Shulze-Boysen Group.
Walter Gersmann	(1914–1942)	Gardener	KPD member and Soviet intelligence agent. Soviet parachutist.		Arrested by the Gestapo on 18 or 19 May 1942, the day after parachuting from a plane near the village of Dittau	Executed at the end of 1942	Trained as an agent by the GRU and sent to Europe. Betrayed members of the Bästlein-Jacob-Abshagen Group after being turned by the Gestapo after almost a year of captivity.
Selma Gessner–Bührer	(1916–1974)	Swiss Soviet agent	Worked for Maria Josefovna Poliakova in Switzerland in 1936.	Rote Drei		Survived the war	Recalled in 1941 by Moscow to provide assistance to Alexander Radó. Acted as a cutout between Jules Humbert-Droz and Alexander Foote.
Karl Giering	(1900–1945)	Gestapo agent and police officer	First head of Sonderkommando Rote Kapelle.			Died of throat cancer before the end of the war.	Kriminalrat in AMT, Abteilung II, RSHA. Leading detective in the search for Soviet agents in Belgium and France. Was replaced by Heinz Pannwitz in August 1943 as he was dying of cancer.
Pierre Giraud	(1914–1943)		Trepper Group		December 1942 in Paris	Committed suicide in early 1943 at Fresnes. Husband of Suzanne Giraud.	
Suzanne Giraud	(1910–?)		Custodian of a wireless telegraphy set located in Le Pecq. Worked as a courier transporting documents between the French communists and the Trepper Group.	Trepper Group	Arrested in 1942	Presumably executed in 1942 or 1943	Wife of Pierre Giraud, who was recruited by Léon Grossvogel. Codename was Lucy and worked under the name of Lucienne Giraud, Trepper's connection to the French Communist Party.
Robert Giraud	(1906–1943)		Courier	Trepper Group			Giraud was the main liaison between Trepper and executive committee of the French Communist Party.
Hans Bernd Gisevius	(1904–1974)	German diplomat and intelligence officer	Informant	Rote Drei		Survived the war.	Gisevius liaison in Zürich between Allen Dulles, station chief for the American OSS and the German Resistance forces in Germany. Rudolf Roessler identified Gisevius as a source to a friend after the war.
Walter Glass	(1889–1956)	Pattern shop owner	Housed and fed Bernhard Bästlein with his daughters in 1944 at his own apartment		5 July 1944	VGH ruling on 1 November 1944, sentenced to four years in jail	Glass was the father of Lucie Nix and Vera Wulff.
Carl Friedrich Goerdeler	(1884–1945)	German politician	Informant	Rote Drei	12 August 1944	Hanged on 2 February 1945 in Plötzensee Prison	Joined the 20 July plot to assassinate Hitler. He is one of the four Rote Drei sources in Germany named by Rudolf Roessler.
Ursula Goetze	(1916–1943)	Student	Apartment was used for a number of secret meetings.	Schulze-Boysen and Harnack groups	15 October 1942 in Berlin	18 January 1943, the 2nd senate of the Reichskriegsgericht announced death penalty for conspiracy to commit high treason and favouring the enemy	
Sarah Goldberg	(1921–2003)		Radio operator in Belgium. Recruited by Hermann Isbutzki.	Trepper Group	4 June 1943	Deported to Germany and then Auschwitz concentration camp	After the Red Orchestra was destroyed in Belgium in 1943, transferred to work with Jewish partisans in Brussels. Rescued on 23 April 1945. Survived the war. Founding member of Belgian section of Amnesty International.
Joseph Goldenberg					Arrested in early 1942	Fort Breendonk concentration camp from September 1942 to March 1943, died there on 13 April 1943 following an "interrogation".	
Herbert Gollnow	(1911–1943)	Consular Secretary, at the Federal Foreign Office	Later, lieutenant in the Luftwaffe working as a Liaison officer from the Abwehr	Harnack Group	Arrested on 19 October 1942 in Berlin	Reichskriegsgericht announced death penalty for conspiracy to commit high treason and favouring the enemy on 19 December 1942.	One of the core members of Harnack Group
Otto Gollnow	(1923–1944)	Bank apprentice, soldier			26 September 1942 in Berlin	Reichskriegsgericht announced death penalty for undermining the military, received a six-year prison sentence.	
Daniël Goulooze	(1901–1965)	Director of the Communist Party of the Netherlands	Radio operator. Liaison officer between CPN and the Communist International in Moscow.	Hilda Group	Arrested sometime in 1943	Survived the war.	Codenames:Daan.Not charged as a terrorist by as a spy and survived by changing his name in the concentration camp.
Max Grabowski	(1897–1981)	Painter and decorator	Participated in the dissemination of the illegal paper, Die Innere Front (The Home Front)	Schulze-Boysen Group			Brother of Otto Grabowski. Printed the Die Innere Front in his paint workshop.
Otto Grabowski	(1892–1961)		Participated in the dissemination of the illegal paper, Zeitung Neuköllner Sturmfahne	Schulze-Boysen Group			Brother of Max Grabowski. Founder of Die Innere Front
Herbert Grasse	(1910–1942)	Printer	KJVD, KPD. Participated in the productions of the illegal paper, Zeitung Neuköllner Sturmfahne	Wilhelm Schürmann-Horster group	Arrested on 23 October 1942 in Berlin	Committed suicide the day after his arrest	Had close links with the group around Wilhelm Schürmann-Horster and later had contact with John Sieg. Later pushed for joint actions in the AEG factory amongst workers who were resisting.
John Graudenz	(1884–1942)	Journalist, photographer, sales representative	In charge of the technical aspects of the producing the AGIS leaflets. Later helped Schulze Boysen organise intelligence.	Schulze Boysen Group	12 September 1942 in Berlin	On 19 December 1942 the 3rd senate of the Reichskriegsgericht sentenced him to the death penalty because of preparation for high treason, enemy favour, destruction of the military force and espionage	
Karin Graudenz				Schulze Boysen Group	Arrested on 12 September 1942 in Berlin; released after two weeks.		Daughter of John Graudenz. Also called Karin Reetz after being married.
Silva Graudenz				Schulze Boysen Group	Arrested on 12 September 1942 in Berlin; released after two weeks.		Daughter of John Graudenz
Toni Graudenz	(died 1985)	Press photographer		Schulze-Boysen group	Arrested on 12 September 1942 in Berlin	On the 12 September 1942 in Berlin the 2nd senate of the Reichskriegsgericht sentenced to three years in prison for listening to enemy transmitter and omission of an advertisement. Survived the war.	Third wife of John Graudenz
Manfred von Grimm	(1911–?)			Long Group	Arrested October 1942	Survived the war. Became the Minister of Cultural Affairs in Lower Saxony.	Codenamed Grau for Rote Drei. Worked for Polish intelligence.
Adolf Grimme	(1889–1963)	Prussian Minister of Science, Art and Education	Sent letters to university professors and distributed pamphlets	Harnack group	Avoided the death penalty in 1943 by informing on the Red Orchestra. The 2nd Senate of the Reichskriegsgericht sentenced him on 2 February 1943 for the preparation of a treasonous enterprise and because of enemy privileges to three years penitentiary	Survived the war	Friends with Adam Kuckhoff.
Maria Grimme				Harnack group		Survived the war	Wife of Adolf Grimme.
Anna Griotto		Courier for Henry Robinson group in France	Own house used to hold meeting between Henry Robinson and Trepper Group members	Trepper Group		Survived the war	Wife of Medardo Griotto.
Medardo Griotto	(1901–1943)	Engraver	Produce fake documents, also operated a safe house	Trepper group	Reichskriegsgericht sentenced him to death in March 1943.	Executed on 28 July 1943 in Plötzensee Prison	Suspected of being Henry Robinson's main assistant.
Léon Grossvogel	(1904–?)	Electrician and manager	Ran the 1st Trepper sub-network. Provided intelligence concerning industry and economy. Responsible for the communications networks of the Trepper Group.	Trepper Group	Arrested in 1943 by Gestapo	Possibly executed in Fresnes Prison, possibly survived the war	Husband of Jeanne Grossvogel-Pesant. Worked at Le Roi du Caoutchouc. Later created the Foreign Excellent Rain Coat Company with Jules Jaspar.
Jeanne Grossvogel-Pesant	(1901–1943)	Manager of ostend branch of Le Roi du Caoutchouc	Ran the 3rd Trepper sub-network Later created the Foreign Excellent Rain Coat Company with Jules Jaspar and her husband.	Trepper Group	Arrested 25 November 1942	Executed in July 1943 in Plötzensee Prison	Wife of Léon Grossvogel
Malvina Gruber	(1900–?)	Courier between Paris and Brussels and Cutout between Rajchmann and Trepper.		Gurevich Group	Arrested in Brussels on 12 October 1942	Protected by the Sonderkommando, used to discover other agents in Brussels and Paris. In August 1947 in prison in Belgium, later sentenced to 10 years imprisonment in February 1949 by court martial in Brussels, released December 1951.	Wife of Adolf Gruber. Mistress of Abraham Rajchmann, the forger. In 1953, Gruber still engaged in espionage.
Wilhelm Guddorf	(1902–1943)	Journalist and writer	Communist	Harnack group	Arrested on 10 October 1942 and sentenced to death in February 1943. The 2nd Senate of the Reichskriegsgericht announced on 3 February 1943 the death sentence for preparation for high treason and because of enemy favouritism	Executed at Plötzensee Prison in Berlin on 13 May	Important member of Schulze-Boysen Group as well.
Hilde Guddorf	(1907–1980)	Shorthand typist, later GDR politician	Communist member of Young Communist League of Germany and Communist Party of Germany	Harnack Group		Survived the war	Husband of Wilhelm Guddorf. Worked with the Uhrig group.
Anatoly Gurevich	(1913–2009)	Soviet agent. Provided intelligence to Trepper from François Darlan and the Girauds.	Ran the 7th Trepper sub-network.	Trepper Group	12 November 1942 in Marseille	Returned to Soviet Union, sent to Lubyanka prison, later deported to labour camp. Rehabilitated in 1990.	Leader of the Gurevich Group. Real name Anatoly Gurevich. Codenames: Kent, Fritz, Arthus Barcza, Simon Urwith, Manolo, Dupuis, Lebrun); see name Table. G. Founded the Simexco company as a cover for intelligence work in Brussels in autumn 1940. Gurevich and Nazarin Drailly were principal stockholders and managing directors.

== H ==
People of the Red Orchestra
Name	Life	Employment	Rote Kapelle or military position	Group	Arrested	Fate	Notes
Max Habjanic		Swiss bureaucrat of Balkan descent	Provider of fake identity papers	Rote Drei		Survived the war	Code name:Cobbler Max. Provided passports for Anna Barbara Müller that eventually reached Henry Robinson. Habjanic used blank forms to create passports and then sent individual copies of each form to various senior police officers who signed them without suspecting what they were.
Ruthild Hahne	(1910–2001)	Sculptor	Communist. House used as a meeting place. Worked on the Die Innere Front	Harnack and Schulze-Boysen Groups	Arrested on 21 August 1943. The 2nd Senate of the People's Court sentenced her on 21 August 1943 to four years in prison. In February 1945, Hahne was able to escape from the women's prison in Cottbus	Survived the war	Became involved with Harnack through Fritz Cremer, Cay von Brockdorff, and Wolfgang Thiess. Moved to East Germany after the war and joined the Socialist Unity Party of Germany.
Rudolf Hamburger	(1903–1980)	Architect	GRU, Red Army intelligence agent, Undertaking photographic jobs	Rote Drei		Survived the war	Codename Rudi. First husband of Ursula Kuczynski, who was Sonia directing Swiss groups.
Edmond Hamel	(1910–?)	Trained as a wireless specialist	Trained by Alexander Foote on WT operations and began transmitting to Moscow in March 1941	Rote Drei	8 October 1943. Served only five days as Swiss did not know his true identity.	Released July 1944. Sentenced in 1947 and imprisoned for nine months. Survived the war.	Husband of Olga Hamel.
Olga Hamel	(1907–?)	Trained as a wireless specialist	Assisted her husband in the transmission of WT traffic.	Rote Drei	8 October 1943	Released July 1944. Later sentenced to 7 months in 1947 by a Swiss court.	Code name: Delez, Maud. Wife of Edmond Hamel. When arrested, 129 messages were found in their flat. Received large sums of money from Alexander Radó in 1942 and 1942
Ernst Happach			Ran a duplicating machine in his apartment to duplicate AGIS leaflets created in part by John Graudenz	Shulze-Boysen Group	Arrested in Berlin on 12 September 1942	Spend two years in prison for "failure to report a plan of high treason".	Recruited by Libertas Schulze-Boysen
Arvid Harnack	(1901–1942)	Jurist, economist	Scientific expert in the Reich Economic Ministry	Formed the Harnack Group	Arrested on 7 September 1942.	The 3rd senate of the Reichskriegsgericht announced the death penalty on 19 December 1942. Hanged four days later at Plötzensee Prison.	
Falk Harnack	(1913–1991)	Director and screenwriter	Leafletting	Harnack Group, later joined White Rose	Arrested and acquitted on 19 April 1943. In August 1943 he was removed from Wehrmacht and transferred to a penal battalion, the 999th Light Afrika Division. In December 1943 sent to a concentration camp but escaped.	Survived the war in Greece	Brother to Arvid Harnack.
Mildred Harnack	(1902–1943)	Literary historian and translator	Brought together a discussion circle at home that created the Red Orchestra	Harnack Group	Arrested on 7 September with her husband Arvid Harnack, when a radio message they had sent was read by Referat 12	Initially given six years in prison, but Hitler ordered a new trial and she was sentenced to death on 16 January 1943 by the 3rd senate of the Reichskriegsgericht. She was executed on the same day.	Mildred Harnack is the only member of the Red Orchestra whose burial site is known.
Hilde Hauck	(1905–1988)	Administrator and interpreter	KPD			Survived the war	Under the supervision of the Gestapo for the duration of the War.
Hans Hausamann	(1897–1974)	Swiss author and intelligence officer	Provided information to Czech Colonel Karel Sedlacek	Directed Büro Ha, the unofficial autonomous Swiss intelligence centre, loosely attached to official Swiss military intelligence.		Survived the war	
Robert Havemann	(1910–1982)	Chemist and later East German dissident	KPD, founded the European Union resistance group		Arrested in 1943.	Fate was postponed several times until the Brandenburg-Görden Prison was liberated by the Red Army. Survived the war	
Wolfgang Havemann	(1910–1982)	Lawyer	Communist	Harnack Group	Arrested on 5 September 1943 by Gestapo. The 2nd senate of the Reichskriegsgericht condemned him on 17 February 1943 for failed high treason to nine months in prison	Survived the war	Son of Gustav Havemann, who was a prominent Nazi. Created the European Union Resistance Group. On 16 December 1943 sentenced to death by the People's Court and later had the sentence deferred several times by Wolfgang Wirth, a senior scientist from the Waffenamt.
Horst Heilmann	(1923–1942)	Student and wireless operator. Cryptanalyst	Passed secret communications from the Abwehr to the Group. Later tried to warn Shulze-Boysen when the GRU spy Johann Wenzel's traffic was deciphered by Referat 12 and Schulze-Boysen was exposed.	Schulze-Boysen Group	On 19 December 1942, the 3rd senate of the Reichskriegsgericht announced the death penalty	On 22 December 1942, executed by decapitation at Plötzensee Prison. Executed with Harro Schulze-Boysen.	Recruited by Schulze-Boysen.
Carl Helfrich	(1906–1960)	Journalist	Worked in the Foreign Office, where Rudolf von Scheliha was Head of Unit	Harnack and Schulze-Boysen Groups	Sent directly to a concentration camp	Survived the war	
Bruno Hempel		Leafleting and pamphleting		Schulze-Boysen Group	Arrested in spring 1943	2nd Senate of the People's Court condemned him on 21 August 1943 to two years in Plotzensee prison. Hempel survived the war.	Had contact with Wilhelm Schürmann-Horster
Hans Henniger	(1904–?)	Luftwaffe inspector, later soldier	Allowed John Graudenz to elicit information from him.	Schulze-Boysen Group	Arrested on 9 October 1942 in Berlin	the 2nd Senate of the Reichskriegsgericht announced on 20 January 1943 "for disobedience in the field and surrendering a state secret", and sentenced to four years.	
Rudolf Herrnstadt	(1903–1966)	Journalist	Communist politician and Soviet agent	Von Scheliha Group		Survived the war	During World War II, he held a senior position in the Red Army.
Kurt Hess	(1901–?)	Dentist	Let John Sieg use his dentist's office to host illegal meetings. Communist.				
Henrika Hillbolling			Courier	Winterink Group	Arrested on 19 August 1942 in Amsterdam.	Sent to Fort Breendonk prison. Executed in January 1943.	Her husband, Jacob Hillbolling, was executed at the same time as Henrika.
Jacob Hillbolling			Scout and Courier	Winterink Group		Sent to Fort Breendonk prison. Executed in January 1943.	His wife, Henrika Hillbolling, was executed at the same time as Jacob.
Helmut Himpel	(1907–1943)	Electrical engineer, later became a dentist	Treated Jewish patients free of charge. Distribution of pamphlets. Distributed the teachings of Galen, which cited the Aktion T4 that resulted in Hitler stopping the killing of mentally ill patients.	Through John Graudenz met Schulze-Boysen Group	Arrested on 17 September 1942 in Berlin.	The 2nd Senate of the Reichskriegsgericht Reichskriegsgericht announced on the 26 January 1943 the death penalty citing "preparation for high treason and enemy favoritism".	One of the core group around Schulze-Boysen and fiancé of Maria Terwiel.
Albert Hoessler	(1910–1942?)	Labourer	KPD member, Communist, Soviet intelligence agent			Murdered September 1942 without trial	Codename Stein, Franz. On 5 August 1942 parachuted into Germany. Sent to establish a WT link to Moscow for the Schulze-Boysen Group, initially from Erika von Brockdorff's apartment and then from Oda Schottmüller apartment.
Walter Hoffmann		Toolmaker	Took part in discussion groups, listened to foreign broadcasts and distributed leaflets.	Schulze-Boysen Group		The 2nd Senate of the People's Court sentenced him to one year in prison on 21 August 1943	Personal friend of Harro and Libertas Schulze-Boysen.
Karl Hofmaier	(1897–1988)	Journalist	Expelled from the Swiss Communist Party. Joined the Social Democratic Party of Switzerland.	Rote Drei Group		Survived the war	Close to Alexander Radó and Rachel Dübendorfer.
Walter Homann	(1906–1945)	Locksmith and metal worker	KPD. Worked at the AEG turbine factory helping his colleagues, who were killed at the same time as him.	AEG turbine factory Group	Arrested 8 February 1945.	Sentenced on 21 March 1945 and murdered on the same day at Plötzensee Prison.	
Margarete Hoffmann-Scholz				Trepper Group via the small Basile Maximovitch Group		Sentenced to six years in prison	Niece of the commander of Paris, General Carl-Heinrich von Stülpnagel.
Caroline Hoorickx			Assisted the Belgian network from 1939 to 1941. Courier for Gurevich.	Gurevich Group			Wife of Guillaume Hoorickx. Mistress of Anton Makarov.
Guillaume Hoorickx	(1900–?)	Painter	Agent of the Gurevich Group in Belgium between 1940-1942. Used own apartments for meetings. In early 1942, moved to Simexco to work as a buyer but really as a courier.	Gurevich Group and the Trepper Group	Arrested on 28 December 1942. Repatriated to Belgium on 2 June 1945.	After the war tried to contact former Simexco people.	Codename Bill.
Arthur Hübner	(1899–1962)		During interwar period sent on missions to Europe for the General Staff of the Red Army. Acted as a Scout			Survived the war	Precursor to the Red Orchestra. Many of Hübner's family were involved the Schulze-Boysen and Harnack groups. His father was Emil Hübner.
Emil Hübner	(1862–1943)	Politician	Worked for Communist International from the 1920s. Arranged accommodation including his own house for Soviet parachutists.		Arrested September 1942	2nd Senate of the Reichskriegsgericht announced on 10 February 1943 the death penalty. Executed on 5 August 1943 at Plötzensee Prison.	Whole family including grandchildren were arrested and executed. Frida Wesolek was his daughter.
Max Hübner	(1862–1943)	German politician	KPD, worked with the Communist International. Trained as radio operator. Ran a photography shop in his basement to create false documents including passports, set up with KPD money. The unit also built radio transceivers.	Shulze-Boysen Group	Arrested on 18 October 1942 in Berlin.	Death penalty on 10 February 1943 "for aiding and abetting the preparation of a highly treacherous enterprise and espionage".	Worked with Adam Kuckhoff, Wilhelm Guddorf and John Sieg.
Marie Hübner	(1903–2001)	Domestic servant		Shulze-Boysen Group		Survived the war.	Became friends with Erika von Brockdorff. Married Wilhelm Hübner.
Jules Humbert-Droz	(1872–1971)	Swiss journalist and pastor.	Thought to be an agent of Maria Josefovna Poliakova before the war. Later recruited agents for Alexander Radó.	Rote Drei	Arrested June 1942 and expelled from Switzerland	Known to have survived the war	Established Comintern Youth International in Switzerland with Willi Münzenberg and Henry Robinson.
Arlette Humbert-Laroche	(1915–1945)	French poet and secretary at an unemployed workers' organisation	Distributing leaflets to factories.	Travelled between several groups	Arrested January 1943	She was locked up in Fresnes Prison, then deported to Germany where she was sent to Ravensbrück camp, then to Mauthausen and later Bergen-Belsen concentration camp	
Charlotte Hundt	(1900–1943)	Clerk	Hosted the parachutist Ernst Beuthke at her house.		Arrested on 17 May 1943 in Wittenau	Executed on 11 August 1943 in the industrial house of the Sachsenhausen concentration camp	Friends of the Ernst Beuthke family. Killed on the same day as Dora Baumann, Anna Becker, Anna Beuthke, Charlotte Beuthke, Lina Mueller, Wally Radoch and Ella Trebe, one day after their husbands.
Marta Husemann	(1913–1960)	Actress	Communist. KPD member.	Schulze-Boysen Group	In November 1936 and the following March to June 1937 detained at the Moringen concentration camp. 2nd Senate of the Reichskriegsgericht sentenced her on 26 January 1943 for preparing a highly treasonous company to a 4 years of imprisonment. Captured in 1945 by the Red Army.	Survived the war	Husband of Walter Husemann.
Walter Husemann	(1909–1943)	Editor	Communist. Worked for the NKGB	Schulze-Boysen Group	On 9 September 1942, Husemann was arrested at this workplace. Sentenced to death on January 26, 1943, for "Preparation to high treason and aid for espionage" and executed at Plötzensee Prison	2nd Senate of the Reichskriegsgericht announced on 26 January 1943 for preparation for treason and aiding espionage. Executed on 13 May 1943	Codename Akim. Taught Hans Coppi the radio in 1941.

== I ==
People of the Red Orchestra
Name	Life	Employment	Rote Kapelle or military position	Group	Arrested	Fate	Notes
Else Imme	(1885–1943)	Retail manager	Collected monies for persecuted fellow citizens. Distributed Soviet radio transmissions. Held illegal meetings in her apartment for the Schulze-Boysen group	Schulze-Boysen Group	Arrested 18 October 1942. On 30 January 1943, 2nd Senate of the Reichskriegsgericht sentenced her to death for favoring the enemy	5 August 1943 executed at Plötzensee Prison	
Hermann Isbutzki	(1914–1944)		Radio operator who was to build his own network	Gurevich Group then Trepper Group and later Jeffremov Group	Arrested on August 13, 1942 in Brussels	Executed in July 1944 in Plötzensee Prison.	Arrested when Jefremov, who was under German control betrayed him, and tortured for almost a year. Heinz Pannwitz used his name to conduct playbacks, i.e. maintaining the connection to Moscow.

== J ==
People of the Red Orchestra
Name	Life	Employment	Rote Kapelle or military position	Group	Arrested	Fate	Notes
Franz Jacob	(1906–1944)	Machine fitter	Built the Saefkow-Jacob-Bästlein Group	Saefkow-Jacob-Bästlein Group	4 July 1944	On 5 September 1944 sentenced to death by the People's Court and executed on 18 September 1944, at Brandenburg-Görden Prison	
Krystana Iwanowa Janewa	(1914–1944)	Soviet agent		Shulze-Boysen, Harnack and Bästlein Groups	Arrested in late 1944. Taken to the Barnimstrasse women's prison in Berlin and later transferred to a prison in Halle	Janewa died from ill treatment	
Jean Baptiste Janssens	(1898–?)	Shoemaker	Courier	Jeffremov Group	Arrested January 1943	Janssens died in Breendonk concentration camp	
Jules Jaspar	(1878–1963)	Belgian Consul	Director of Foreign Excellent Raincoat Company. Helped people persecuted by the Nazis.	Trepper Group	Arrested and sent to Mauthausem concentration camp	Liberated in May 1945. Survived the war	In 1942, helped establish Simexco in Marseille.
Konstantin Jeffremov	(1910–?)	Soviet Army Captain, engineer and chemical warfare expert	Soviet agent	Worked all over Europe, later built Jeffremov Group in Belgium	Arrested on 22 July 1942 and conducted a playback in Fort Breendonk until late November 1944	Unknown	Agent active in Europe from 1936.

== K ==
People of the Red Orchestra
Name	Life	Employment	Rote Kapelle or military position	Group	Arrested	Fate	Notes
Ludwig Kainz		Construction engineer in Organisation Todt			December 1942 in Paris	Sentenced to three years in prison	
David Kamy	(1911–1943)	Graduate Chemist	Radio operator who was trained by Johann Wenzel alongside Sophia Poznańska.	Gurevich Group	13 December 1941		Assumed to be Anton Danilov while undercover. Captured at 101 Rue des Atrebates, Brussels
Louis Kapelowitz	(1891–19??)	Czech commercial director	Director of the Excellent Raincoat Company and later director of the subsidiary, the Foreign Excellent Raincoat Company	Trepper Group		Survived the war	Kapelowitz's wife, Sarah, was the sister of Leon Grossvogel. Maurice Padawer and Adolf Lerner, directors of the Foreign Excellent Raincoat Company, were both married to sisters of Louis Kapelowitz.
Hillel Katz	(1905–1943)		Secretary at Simex company	Trepper Group	December 1942 when the Simex people were rounded up.	Disappeared in November 1943. Likely shot without trial	Code names:Andre Dubois, Rene and Le Petit Andre. Assistant to Trepper who betrayed him. He was responsible for liaison between Leon Grossvogel, Henry Robinson and the Simex company. His brother, Joseph Katz (aka Mayer ben Josef Katz), was part of the Lyon network.
Gerhard Kegel	(1907–1989)	Diplomat	KPD member	Von Scheliha Group		Survived the war.	According to Simon Wiesenthal, Kegel worked for the Gestapo during World War II.
Waldemar Heinrich Keller	(1906–1991)	Simex technical advisor		Trepper Group	Arrested on 19 November 1942 in Paris	Sentenced to three years in prison	Made a fortune before his arrest by dealing in industrial diamonds with the Todt Organization. Seemed to be an agent who worked mainly for money.
Helmut Kindler	(1912–2008)	Journalist		European Union Group		Had a successful career after the war.	Kindler was a childhood friend of Ilse Stöbe.
Richard Klotzbücher	(1902–1945)	Cashier and HR person at AEG Turbine Factory	Suppression of Nazi state efforts	Saefkow-Jacob-Bästlein Organization	Arrested on 22 February 1945	Executed on 10 April 1945 in Plötzensee Prison for "preparation of treason"	
Heinrich Koenen	(1910–1945)	German engineer	Soviet agent	Von Scheliha Group	Arrested on 29 October 1942	Executed without trial at Sachsenhausen concentration camp in February 1945	Parachutist. Parachuted into Germany on 23 October 1942 to receive some intelligence from Rudolf von Scheliha and blackmail him if the intelligence was not forthcoming but was arrested within several days.
Aleksandr Mikhaylovich Korotkov	(1909–1961)	Soviet Agent	Recruited Arvid Harnack around December 1941.			Survived the war	1941 Deputy Resident of the NKVD in Berlin. Code name was Alexander Erdberg. Erdberg acted as a contact between Moscow and the Harnack and Schulze-Boysen groups in Berlin. Later from 1946 to 1957 Korotkov was deputy Head of foreign intelligence service of the KGB of the USSR
Anna Krauss	(1884–1943)	Lacquer and paint wholesaler	Fortune-teller and clairvoyant who counted Libertas Schulze-Boysen as a client. She used her apartment to create and print leaflets and pamphlets with John Graudenz	Schulze-Boysen Group	September 14, 1942 in Berlin	2nd Senate of the Reichskriegsgericht announced on 12 February 1943 the death penalty for decomposing the military force	Read the fortunes of all the Schulze-Boysen group to provide and engender a steely backbone for the group.
Werner Krauss	(1900–1976)	German Romanist academic	KPD Communist.	Schulze-Boysen Group	24 November 1942 in Berlin	2nd Senate of the Reichskriegsgericht announced the death penalty on 18 January 1943, the sentence was revised on 14 September 1944 to five years in prison. Survived the war	Made contact with Shulze-Boysen via John Rittmeister and supported their actions on many occasions. Krauss wrote an anti-fascist novel Die Passionen der halykonischen Seele in 1943. His sentence was commuted from the death penalty to a period in jail after a plea of clemency from his academic friends at the University of Marburg where he was employed.
Willy Kruyt (John W. Kruyt Sr.)	(1877–1943)	Dutch Protestant minister	Soviet agent, Parachutist	Jeffremov Group	20 July 1942	Successively jailed in St Gilles, Breedonck, and Moabit prisons. Believed to have been executed at Moabit in 1943.	Sent by Soviet intelligence to provide a bastion for the Jeffremov Group
John W. Kruyt Jr.	(1926–?)		Soviet agent, Parachutist				Dropped in the Netherlands to supply a radio to Daan Goulooze. Son of John W. Kruyt Sr.
Walter Küchenmeister	(1897–1943)	German machine technician, communist, political writer	Wrote a number of pamphlets	Schulze-Boysen Group	Arrested on 16 September 1942	On 6 February 1943, he was sentenced to death by the 2nd Senate of the Imperial War Court for belonging to the resistance organisation. Executed on 13 May 1943 in Plötzensee Prison.	
Adam Kuckhoff	(1887–1943)	German writer, journalist who wrote on communist and marxist philosophies	Produced and collaborated on illegal pamphlets. Also worked on writing the Die Innere Front	Harnack Group	12 September 1942, arrested in Prague. The 2nd Senate of the Reichskriegsgericht announced the death penalty on 6 February 1943 for preparing a highly treasonous company and for Enemy favorability	5 August 1943, executed at Plötzensee Prison	Also closely affiliated with the Shulze-Boysen Group and considered an important member of both groups. His wife was Greta Kuckhoff.
Margarete Kuckhoff	(1902–1981)	Economist		Harnack Group	Arrested on 12 September 1942, the same day as her husband.	On 3 February 1943, she was sentenced to death as an accomplice to high treason and [for] failure to report a case of espionage by the 2nd Senate of the Reichskriegsgericht. However her sentence was lifted on 4 May 1943, but a second trial on 27 September 1943 resulted in a sentence of ten years at Waldheim Prison where she was liberated by the Red Army in May 1945. Survived the war	Known by the first name as Greta. Husband was Adam Kuckhoff. Important member of the Harnack Group as well.
Ursula Kuczynski	(1907–2000)	Editor	Soviet agent.			Survived the war	Code name: Ruth Werner, Ursula Beurton, and Ursula Hamburger. Sent to Switzerland during the interwar period to build an intelligence network. Later she became a handler of Klaus Fuchs, couriering intelligence to the Soviet Union from 1943. Considered one of the top Soviet spy's during the post-war period. KPD member.
Yvonne Kuenstlunger			Cutout	Trepper Group			Cousin of Rita Arnould. Managed the contacts between Rue des Atrébates and Isidor Springer.
Hansheinrich Kummerow	(1903–1944)	Telecommunications engineer and designer at the Opta Radio AG in Berlin	Supplied intelligence to the Soviet Union		Arrested in Berlin at the end of November 1942	3rd senate of the Reichskriegsgericht announced on 18 December 1942 the death penalty for high treason. Beheaded in Halle Prison on 4 February 1944.	Husband of Ingeborg Kummerow. Occasionally used Schulze-Boysen's groups radio transmitter to transmit reports to Moscow.
Ingeborg Kummerow	(1912–1943)				Arrested in September 1942. On January 27, 1943, she was sentenced to death for aiding and abetting espionage by the 4th Senate of the Reichskriegsgericht.	On 5 August 1943, she was executed in Plötzensee Prison	Wife of Hansheinrich Kummerow.
Hans Kurfess	(1915–?)	Lawyer	German cryptanalyst worked in Referat 12				Later enciphered texts prepared by Anatoly Gurevich as part of Sonderkommando Pannwitz in Paris.

== L ==
People of the Red Orchestra
Name	Life	Employment	Rote Kapelle or military position	Group	Arrested	Fate	Notes
François Lachenal	(1918–1997)	Swiss publisher and diplomat	Informant	Rote Drei			Code name: Diener. Passed low grade intelligence to Jean-Pierre Vigier, the son in law of Rachel Dübendorfer.
Otto Lang	(1890–1945)	Office worker. Also employed as an umbrella maker.	SPD	Working in AEG factory, spreads foreign news and leaflets. Support families who have been persecuted by the Nazi's.	Arrested in February 1945	On 10 April 1945, murdered in Plötzensee Prison	
Fritz Lange	(1898–1981)	Teacher and soldier	Co-editor of the Die Innere Front	Bernhard Bästlein and Wilhelm Guddorf	On 8 October 1943 the 2nd Senate of Reichskriegsgericht sentenced him to five years in prison "for aiding the high treason and enemy favoritism"	Survived the war	Member of the Harnack Group through Wilhelm Guddorf.
Hans Lautenschläger		Commercial employee and union official		Schulze-Boysen group	Arrested on 24 February 1943 on Guernsey	The 2nd Senate of the Reichskriegsgericht on 3 July 1943 for decomposition of the military force and preparation for high treason. The death penalty was never carried out.	Married Ina Ender on 14 September 1936. He and his wife, Ina, appeared as themselves in a 1988 titular documentary-style film directed by Thomas Grimm.
Claire Legrand	(?–1944)			Trepper Group	Arrested on 30 November 1942 in Marseille by the Gestapo	In November 1944 sent to Auschwitz concentration camp and executed.	Wife of Jules Jaspar.
Willy Lehmann	(1884–1942)	Police officer, Gestapo	Soviet Agent	Worked in the Office IV of the Reich Security Main Office	December 1942 discovered	Shot without a trial	
Ernst Lemmer	(1898–1970)	German journalist, later politician	Informant for Georges Blun	Rote Drei		Survived the war.	Code name: Agnes.
Waldemar Lentz	(1909-1985)	German cryptanalyst worked in Referat 12 and part of Sonderkommando Pannwitz in Paris			Arrested on 5 September 1942 in Berlin and later released.	Survived the war	Members of Referat 12 detached to Aussenstelle Paris.
Friedrich Lenz	(1885–1968)	Professor of economics	Liaison between intelligence groups and the Soviet embassy. cutout between Harnack and the Soviet embassy in 1941.	Harnack Group and others		Survived the war and went back into academia.	His Soviet principal was Gunther Lubszynski.
Abraham Isaac Lerner	(1891–?)	Commercial director	Director of the Foreign Excellent Raincoat Company	Trepper Group		Managed to escape arrest in May 1941 and moved to New York via Portugal	Code name: Adolf.
Antonia Lyon-Smith	(1925–2010)	Schoolchild	Betrayed the French resistance.		21 October 1943 by Heinz Pannwitz.	Went on to live a happy life in Devon.	Acquainted with Claude Spaak who procured false papers for her. Unwittingly assisted the escape of Leopold Trepper. Daughter of British Brigadier Tristram Lyon-Smith. She became linked to Gestapo agent, Karl Gagl, a member of Sonderkommando Pannwitz, who wanted to marry her but didn't.
Wilhelm Leist	(1899–1945)	Toolmaker	KPD	Founded a resistance group at the AEG turbine factory	Arrested on 7 March 1945 by the Gestapo	Murdered on 10 April 1945 at Plötzensee Prison	
Hans Gerhardt Lubszynski	(1904–?)	German research and radio engineer, member of the German Communist Party.	Informant	Trepper Group			Identified in the Robinson papers an agent. Worked with Heinz Erwin Kallmann in England who identified with the code name of Professor.
Rose Luschinsky	(1903–?)	Physician		Trepper Group			Sister of Rachel Dübendorfer. Identified in the Robinson papers an agent under the code name: Jenny.

== M ==
People of the Red Orchestra
Name	Life	Employment	Rote Kapelle or military position	Group	Arrested	Fate	Notes
Mikhail Makarov	(1915–circa 1942)	Soviet intelligence agent	Ran the Foreign Excellent Raincoat Company. Was an expert in false documents and secret inks.	Trepper Group		Executed in Plötzensee Prison circa 1942.	Code name Carlos Alamo, Chemnitz. Offered wireless telegraphy training to people recruited by Trepper.
Helmut Marquardt		Assistant radio operator		Shulze-Boysen Group		Acquittal in a trial of the 2nd senate of the Reichskriegsgericht on 3 July 1943	After his acquittal the 19-year-old Marquart received a protective detention order and was admitted to Sachsenhausen concentration camp.
Charles Mathieu		Inspector in Belgian Gendarmerie					On behalf of the Gestapo, penetrated the Rote Kapelle in Belgium, leading to the arrest of Jeffremov.
Anna Maximovitch	(1901–1943)	Neurologist	Ran the 4th Trepper sub-network	Trepper Group	December 1942	20 July 1943 in Plötzensee Prison	Code name: Arztin. Provided intelligence from French clerical and royalist sources including Bishop Chaptal of Paris.
Basile Maximovitch	(1902–1943)	Chemist and Civil-Mining engineer	Ran the 3rd Trepper sub-network	Trepper Group	16 December 1942	6 July 1943 at Plötzensee Prison	Code name: Professor. Provided intelligence from white Russian emigrant groups; also from German Wehrmacht personnel. In a relationship with Margarete Hoffmann-Scholz. Brother of Anna Maximovitch.
Bernhard Mayr von Baldegg	(1909–1980)	Swiss intelligence office					Reported to Captain Max Waibel.
Marcel Melliand	(?–1943)	Businessman and publisher of textile magazine	Courier. Schulze-Boysen used John Graudenz to pass information to England via Melliand but Melliand was unable to get a visa.	Schulze-Boysen Group	26 September 1942 in Heidelberg		Had excellent business contacts in Switzerland and was considered a strong anti-fascist.
Franz Mett	(1904–1944)	Miner and metal worker	Built resistance group centred around Robert Uhrig and was in contact with the resistance in Berlin	Uhrig group	4 February 1942	Sentenced to death on 7 June 1944 and executed on 21 August 1944 in Brandenburg-Görden Prison.	
Ewald Meyer	(1911–2003)	Artist and graphic artist	Illustrated a number of banned book by Nazi's that were used to resist. Also helped illustrate leaflets			Survived the war	After the war his career flourished and he had a large number of exhibition in different European countries.
Wilhelm Milke	(1896–1944)	Metalworker	KPD member, Communist	Bästlein-Jacob-Abshagen Group	Arrested on 21 October 1942	Milke was found dead in his cell in Plötzensee Prison	Helped to organise aid for those of were persecuted and supported foreign forced labour.
Juliette Moussier	(1892–?)	Employee of the Confiserie Jacquin, a confectionery manufacturer	PCF member, Courier	Trepper Group			Passed reports from the Trepper Group to the French Communist Party. Later Trepper requested a meeting with Moussier as part of a German playback operation, while he was in custody to prove to Soviet intelligence that he was still free and enable the playback operation to continue, otherwise he would likely have been executed. Instead he managed to pass a long message containing the news that we was exposed along with a large number of people who were captured. Trepper requested that Moscow send a radio message to the Sonderkommando Rote Kapelle from the Red Army to indicate that they understood.
Marius Mouttet	(1876–1968)	French minister, later socialist diplomat and colonial adviser	Informer to Foote	Rote Drei			Did not appear in Rote Drei traffic after 1942.
Anna Barbara Müller	(1880–?)	Seamstress, later owned an appointments agency	Soviet agent		Arrested in June 1943 in Freiburg after being enticed in Germany to help her brother.	Sentenced to death but the Swiss intervened and was given 2 year sentenced. Released by the Soviets.	Code name:Anna (Not the Rote Drei Anna in the German Foreign Office). In 1936 worked for Maria Josefovna Poliakova. Kept in custody during the Robinson interrogation.
Karl Müller	(1904–1945)	German Locksmith who worked at the AEG turbine factory in Berlin	KPD member.	Uhrig Group	February 24, 1945 when he was tortured by the Gestapo	Committed suicide on March 21, 1945 by hanging himself.	
Lina Müller	(1901–1943)		Communist		21 April 1943	Shot dead without trial in Sachsenhausen concentration camp	Husband was Heinrich Müller. Friend of the Ernst Beuthke family. Killed on the same day as Dora Baumann, Anna Becker, Anna Beuthke, Charlotte Beuthke, Charlotte Hundt, Wally Radoch and Ella Trebe on 11 August 1943.
Kurt Müller	(1903–1944)	German carpenter and communist	Prepared and distributed pamphlets.	Part of the resistance group European Union.			Kurt Müller was a half brother of Ilse Stöbe. Also prepared documents to move Jews out of trouble.
Hans Mussig	(1904–?)	French intelligence agent from February 1939			Arrested in Grenoble by the Gestapo	Tortured 35 times by the Gestapo until he agreed to work with the Sonderkommando Pannwitz.	Code name: Jean Varon, Rueff. Married to Ilse Bach. Helped to penetrate French resistance.

== N ==
People of the Red Orchestra
Name	Life	Employment	Rote Kapelle or military position	Group	Arrested	Fate	Notes
Eugen Neutert	(1905–1943)	Electrician. Later retrained as a masseur.	KPD member. Courier, organizer, participated in the dissemination of the illegal paper, Die Innere Front	Uhrig Group	Arrested on 23 October 1942 and sentenced to death in August 1943	The 2nd Senate of the People's Court announced the death penalty on 21 August 1943.On 9 September 1943 he was hanged in Plötzensee Prison	Later became friends with the actor Wilhelm Schürmann-Horster in autumn 1941 and became part of their discussion group.
Lucie Nix	(1916–1991)		Housed Bernhard Bästlein in 1944 when he fled after the Bästlein-Jacob-Abshagen Group was broken up.	Harnack Group by association	Arrested on 5 July 1944.	Sentenced to 4 years in prison. Survived the war.	Father was Walter Glass.
Léon Nicole	(1887–1965)	Swiss labor organiser. President of the Swiss socialist party	Spotter and recruiter	Rote Drei		Survived the war	
Pierre Nicole	(1909–1987)		Cutout between Léon Nicole Alexander Foote and Alexander Radó	Rote Drei		Survived the war	Radio operator. Son of Léon Nicole.
Elsa Noffke	(1905–1943)	Publishing house employee.	Soviet parachutist. Radio operator	Rote Drei	Arrested by the Gestapo soon after being dropped by the RAF in April 1943	Shot dead on 6–7 November 1943 in Ravensbrück concentration camp	Soviet Pickaxe agent.
Erich Nutis	(1918–?)		Secretary in Simexco from January 1942	Trepper Group	Arrested November 1942 and deported to Germant	Released in April 1945 and returned to Belgium	Code name: Andre.

== O ==
People of the Red Orchestra
Name	Life	Employment	Rote Kapelle or military position	Group	Arrested	Fate	Notes
Franz Obermanns	(1909–1982)	Soviet agent	Communist	Rote Drei Group	Arrested in December 1939 in Switzerland	Survived the war	Sent to help the Rote Drei group but arrested and confined during the war.
Jean Otten	(1911–?)	Belgian Salesman	Worked to provide safehouses for the group	Jeffremov Group	2 October 1943 and taken to Fresnes prison	Sentenced to three years in prison and deported to Germany.	Husband of Jeanne Otten. Recruited by Elizabeth Depelsenaire to provide safehouses for Jeffremov network.
Sara Heya Orschitizer	(1904–19??)	Polish wife of Leopold Trepper	Assisted Trepper in espionage activities while in Belgium	Trepper Group		Survived the war	Orschitizer divorced Trepper after the war when she found out about Georgie de Winter.
Jeanne Otten	(1914–?)	Belgian secretary to Phillips Radio Company	Worked to provide safehouses for the group	Jeffremov Group	2 October 1943 and taken to Frensnes prison	Survived the war after being liberated from jail	Wife of Jean Otten. Recruited by Elizabeth Depelsenaire.
Waldemar Ozols	(1884–1949)	Soviet agent	Communist	Ozols Group		Survived the war	Codename SOKOL Solja. Worked for Anatoly Gurevich. Leader of Ozols Group.

== P ==
People of the Red Orchestra
Name	Life	Employment	Rote Kapelle or military position	Group	Arrested	Fate	Notes
Maurice Padawar	(1897–?)	Commercial Director	Director of the Excellent Raincoat Company from 1924	Trepper Group		Survived the war	Helped establish the forerunner to the Raincoat company known as Le Roi du Caoutchouc. Later director of the Foreign Excellent Raincoat company from 1938 onwards. Gurevich used him to send money to Margarete Barcza' mother in New York. Likely new through Grossvogel that both companies were being used for espionage.
Armand Palivoda	(1906–?)	Swiss Director of RKO in Geneva	Transferred funds from New York to Geneva	Rote Drei			
Erwin Panndorf	(1904–1944)	Locksmith and machinist	KPD member. Soviet parachutist and scout.	Links to the Schulze-Boysen and Harnack Groups through the Tuchollas.	Arrested on 2 August 1942	Killed on 10 December 1942 in the Sachsenhausen concentration camp	Helped by Felix and Kathe Tucholla to stay in their apartment in Berlin.
Heinz Pannwitz	(1911–1975)	German Nazi Gestapo officer				Survived the war	In the last two years of the war, Pannwitz ran the Sonderkommando Rote Kapelle, a Gestapo counterintelligence operation against the Red Orchestra espionage network.
Jean Passelecq		Travelling salesman	Shareholder in Simexco via his association with Nazarin Drailly. Supplied intelligence to Gurevich	Gurevich Group	Arrested on 25 November 1942 in Brussels and deported to Germany	Liberated in April 1945 and survived the war	After the war was considered by the 1960 NATO Special Committee report to be anti-communist.
Elfriede Paul	(1900–1981)	Physician	Her medical practice was used as a meeting place. She also helped in creating and disseminate leaflets	Schulze-Boysen Group and Harnack Group through Küchenmeister	Arrested on 16 September 1942 in Berlin	The 2nd senate of the Reichskriegsgericht sentenced her on 6 February 1943 for preparation for high treason to six years in prison.	Lover of Walter Küchenmeister and one of the core members of Schulze-Boysen Group.
Fernand Pauriol	(1913–1944)	Editor	Radio technician who maintained the Trepper Group radios.	Trepper Group	Arrested on 13 August 1943	Sentenced to death on 19 January 1944 after severe torture and shot in his cell on 12 August 1944 in Fresnes Prison near Paris.	After many arrests in Belgium, Pauriol became the most important radio link to Leopold Trepper.
Maurice Peper	(1906–1943)		Courier	Gurevich Group. Later Jeffremov Group. Contact person Winterink Group/group Hilda.	Arrested August 1942 in Brussels by policeman Henry Piepe, who also arrested Anton Wenzel.	Executed on 28 July 1943 in Plötzensee Prison.	Code name: Holländer or Wassermann. Belgian member of Gurevich Group in 1940.
Rene Petipas	(1912–?)	French communist	Liaison between French communists and the Rote Drei.	Trepper Group	December 1943. Arrested same time as Henry Robinson.		Code name: Blanche, Biquette. Provided a safe house for a transmitter. Associate of Maurice Emile Aenis-Hanslin. Robinson was her controller.
Simone Pheter	(1917–1943)	Employee in the Paris office of the Belgian Chamber of Commerce	Courier	Gurevich Group	Arrested in December 1942	Executed on 20 August 1943 in Plötzensee Prison	Mistress of Leon Grossvogel
Henry Friedrich Wilhelm Piepe	(1893–?)	Former state attorney who was Captain in the German army, soldier. Abwehr officer.		Abwher III F			After Piepe arrested Johann Wenzel he drove to Berlin from Brussels, eventually talked to Wilhelm Canaris then Wilhelm Keitel of his finding, which led to order by Keitel to form the Gestapo unit, the Sonderkommando Pannwitz.
Erna Plüschke			Participated in the dissemination of the illegal paper, Die Innere Front and other pamphlets				Wife of Heinrich Plüschke
Heinrich Plüschke	(1897–1954)	Machinist	Also participated in the dissemination of the illegal paper, Die Innere Front and other pamphlets	Harnack Group through John Sieg			
Johann Podsiadlo	(1894–19??)	German artist and teacher	Worked as a translator in the labour recruitment office of the German Kommandantur in Paris. Stole blank forms from his office for use by Käte Voelkner.	Trepper Group	13 January 1943	Date of execution not known.	Lover of Käte Voelkner.
Gisela von Poellnitz (or von Pöllnitz)	(1915–1939)	Young Communist League of Germany member, journalist	Posted a letter from Schulze-Boysen that contained information about German agents (Staff W) working in the Spanish Civil War.	Schulze-Boysen Group			Contracted pulmonary tuberculosis. Poellnitz died on 15 June 1939 in a sanatorium in Switzerland after travelling there on the advice of Dr Elfriede Paul.
Yvonne Clemence Fanny Poelmans	(1910–?)	Gymnast and masseuse	Sheltered Joseph Blumsack and his wife in June or July 1942 following Germaine Schneider's escape to France	Jeffremov Group	Arrested on 7 January 1943		Code name:Mouni. Both Poelmans and the Blumsacks were betrayed by Franz Schneider.
Maria Josefovna Poliakova	(1910–?)	Soviet Military Intelligence employee	Soviet agent	Organised the Rote Drei in Switzerland. Intimately involved in it operation during the war.			Code name: Gisela, Mildred, Vera and Meg
Jeanne Emma Madeleine Ponsaint	(1921–?)	Belgian secretary and typist	Worked at SimexCo as a secretary and typist	Trepper Group	Escaped arrest when Simexco employees were being hunted by the Gestapo in November 1942. Finally arrested on 11 December 1942.	In April 1943, she was deported to Germany where she was imprisoned in Mauthausen concentration camp. Repatriated to Belgium on 8 May 1945	From 25 November 1942 until her arrest on 11 December 1942 she provided accommodation for Nazarin Drailly.
Louse Marie Pauline Ponsart	(1907–?)	Belgian secretary	Worked at SimexCo as a secretary and typist	Trepper Group	Arrested 25 November 1942	Imprisoned in Brussels but released 16 April 1943	
Johann Podsiadlo	(1894–1943)	Artist and arts teacher	Employed as an interpreter at a labour recruiting office. Gave blank forms to his partner stolen from his office to enable resistance workers to travel.	Trepper Group	Arrested in January 1943 in Paris	On 28 July 1943 he was killed at Plötzensee Prison.	Lover of Käte Voelkner. His children, Hans Voelkner and Henry Voelkner, were sent to a SS Children's home (Lebensborn).
Jan Postma	(1895–1944)	Trained by the Comintern and returned from Moscow to run the Dutch section of the International Red Aid	Dutch communist. Worked to organize asylum for German communists who had escaped from Hitler.	Group Hilda	Arrested on 11 November 1943	On April 20, 1944 she was sentenced to death and shot on 23 or 31 July 1944.	
Sophia Poznańska	(1906–1942)	Graduated and Cipher clerk	Palestine Communist Party	Gurevich Group	Arrested on 12–13 December 1941	On 29 September 1942, committed suicide in St Gilles Prison in Brussels	Trained alongside David Kamy by Johann Wenzel. Later worked with Anton Makarov.
Heinz Priess	(1920–1945)	Machinist	Helped the two Soviet parachutists Erna Eifler and Wilhelm Fellendorf	Bästlein-Jacob-Abshagen Group	Arrested on 19 June 1944	On 12 March 1945 was executed in Brandenburg-Görden Prison	Marie Priess was his mother. His brother, Viktor Priess was an intelligence officer with the Red Army and had named his mother's apartment as a safe refuge to use.
Marie Priess	(1885/1899–1983)		Social Democratic Party of Germany member later Communist Party of Germany	Helped the two Soviet parachutists Erna Eifler and Wilhelm Fellendorf, later supported foreign forced laborers.	Arrested on 15 October 1942 in Hamburg, sentenced to death in October 1944	Survived the war due in her own words: Why I survived - I do not know - I was mislaid so often until I was freed from our 'enemies' who were our friends - our liberators What a day!	Mother of Heinz Priess.
Otto Pünter	(1900–1988)	Swiss journalist	Low level intelligence source	Group Pakbo		Survived the war, later lived in Geneva	Code name was Pabko. Close to Alexander Radó. Secret member of Communist Party of Switzerland.
Ann-Marie Van Der Putt	Encipher/deciphering clerk	Belgian		Trepper Group. Later worked with Gurevich in Marseille	Escaped arrest		Trained by Gurevich in enciphering/deciphering procedures.

== R ==
People of the Red Orchestra
Name	Life	Employment	Rote Kapelle or military position	Group	Arrested	Fate	Notes
Hedwig Raasch							Mother of Hilde Coppi. Murdered as part of German Sippenhaft tradition.
Kurt Raasch							Brother of Hilde Coppi. Murdered as part of German Sippenhaft tradition.
Helena Radó	(1901–?)	Soviet intelligence agent	Committed communist who worked on the mapping company Geopress in Geneva.	Rote Drei Group			Wife of Alexander Radó, who was a former secretary to Vladimir Lenin.
Alexander Radó	(1899–1981)	Soviet intelligence agent	Ran the Inpress anti-nazi press agency in Paris before World War II and later became director of the Rote Drei Group	Rote Drei Group		Survived the war	Code names: Dora and Albert. Director of the Rote Drei. Later established the mapping company Geopress in Geneva, that was his cover for espionage work.
Friedrich Radoch	(1903–1943)	Car locksmith		Member of the Little Moscow garden colony. Also called Garden Friends.		Sent to Sachsenhausen concentration camp 18 May 1943	Friends of the Ernst Beuthke family. Killed on the same day as Emil Becker, Ernst Beuthke, Friedrich Beuthke, Richard Beuthke, Walter Beuthke, Heinrich Mueller on 10 August 1943.
Wally Radoch	(1904–1943)	Saleswomen		Member of the Little Moscow garden colony. Also called Garden Friends.		Sent to Sachsenhausen concentration camp 18 May 1943	Wife of Friedrich Radoch. Sister to Charlotte Hundt. Friends of the Ernst Beuthke family. Killed on the same day as Dora Baumann, Anna Becker, Anna Beuthke, Charlotte Beuthke, Charlotte Hundt, Lina Mueller and Ella Trebe on 11 August 1943.
Abraham Rajchmann	(1912–?)	Polish career criminal, expert forger and engraver	Provided false papers for the group	Trepper Group	2 September 1942 in Brussels	Detailed in Breendonk prison and agreed to work with Gestapo	Code names: Adam Blanssi, Kartenmann, Arthur Roussel, Fabrikant, Max. Malvina Gruber was his mistress. Introduced by Grossvogel into the Trepper Group. In 1948 sentenced by a military court in Brussels to 12 years in prison for collaborating with the Gestapo
Jindkinch Heinrich Rauch	(1891–1944)		Employee of Simexco	Gurevich Group	28 December 1942 in Belgium	In April 1943 transferred to Mauthausen concentration camp and killed on 8 January 1944	Known as Henri. Arrested along with Caroline Hoorickx.
Friedrich Rehmer	(1921–1943)	Soldier	Distributed illegal writings to soldiers in the front and leaflets and pamphlets to the inmates of a military hospital when he was injured	Schulze-Boysen	Arrested on 29 November 1942 in Berlin	Sentenced on 18 January 1943 the 2nd Senate of the Imperial War announced the death penalty and killed on 13 May 1943 in Plötzensee Prison	Fiancé was Liane Berkowitz. Became part of the Schulze-Boysen through Ursula Götze, Otto Gollnow, Fritz Thiel and Liane Berkowitz and later Eva Rittmeister and John Rittmeister. Eva was his classmate at the evening school.
Gerda Rehmer					Not arrested	Survived the war	Married name was Gerda Siebert. Only tangentially linked to Rote Kapelle. Sister of Friedrich Rehmer.
Oskar Reincke	(1907–1944)	Carpenter	KPD member, Communist	Bästlein-Jacob-Abshagen Group	17 October 1942	10 July 1944 at Hamburg's Holstenglacis Prison	Helped found the resistance group in December 1941.
Henri Joseph De Reymaeker	(1907–?)	Belgian agent	Obtained false documents for Rauch and Hoorickx that were subsequently used by Anton Danilow and other members of the group.	Gurevich Group	Arrested multiple times during the war and again arrested in August 1945 by the Belgian authorities but was released by mid 1946.	Survived the war	Code names: Rik, Rik van Janneke
Herbert Richter-Luckian	(1901–1944)	German Architect	KPD, Communist. Provided intelligence from the Oberkommando der Luftwaffe to Schulze-Boysen, as part of contract work.	Schulze-Boysen Group	5 September 1943 by the Gestapo	16 December 1943 by People's Court sentenced to death and killed on 8 May 1944 in Brandenburg-Görden Prison	Co-founder of the European Union group, along with the doctor Georg Groscurth, the chemist, Robert Havemann and the dentist Paul Rentsch.
Heinrich Reiser	(1895–1963)	Gestapo agent and SS officer	Ran the Gestapo post in Karlsruhe.				Worked with Pannwitz in the Sonderkommando Pannwitz. According to Pannwitz, Reiser was a typical Gestapo type. Reiser and the policeman Henry Piepe arrested Henry Robinson.
Eva Rittmeister	(1917–1942)	German Paediatric nurse, office clerk	Helped Harro Schulze-Boysen to decide to use leaflets and pamphlets to resist the Nazi's.	Schulze-Boysen Group	26 September 1942	On the 12 February 1943 the 2nd Senate of the Reichskriegsgericht sentenced her to three years in prison for intercepting hostile broadcasters	One of the core members of the Schulze-Boysen Group Has the original idea for Agis leaflets.
John Rittmeister	(1898–1943)	German psychoanalyst and neurologist	Listen to foreign broadcasts that was used to formulate the contents of pamphlets. Collaborated with Shulze-Boysen in the formulation of the Agis leaflets and eventually worked on The concern for Germany's future goes through the people	Schulze-Boysen Group	26 September 1942 in Berlin	2nd Senate of the Reichskriegsgerichts Court announced the death penalty on 12 February 1943 "for preparation for high treason and enemy favouritism"	
Henry Robinson	(1897–1943)	Communist International (Comintern) agent	Ran the 2nd Trepper sub-network. Provided intelligence from French military and political groups, from the Vichy intelligence, specifically the Deuxième Bureau, from Guallist groups and the central committee of the French Communist Party.	Trepper Group	December 1943. Betrayed by Trepper and arrested by Abwehr Captain Harry Piepe and the Sonderkommando Pannwitz.	Tortured for six months before being moved to Moabit detention centre where he was killed in 1944	Robinson became the section leader for the area of Switzerland, France and Great Britain by 1940-1941 and ran a discrete network of agents in the 1930s. Robinson was forced to transfer his agents to Trepper in December 1940 when the Comintern was dissolved. Robinson considered a Trepper a subordinate and considered him an enemy. When he was arrested, the later famous Robinson Papers were found.
Josef Römer	(1892–1944)	Lawyer	KPD member, Communist. Published the KPD underground magazine Aufbruch.	Harnack Group	19 June 1944 sentenced to death by the Reichskriegsgerichts court	25 September 1944 executed by a hatchet at Brandenburg-Görden Prison	Linked to John Sieg, Arthur Sodtke and Robert Uhrig.
Rudolf Roessler	(1897–1958)	Ran a small publishing firm in Lucerne, Switzerland called Vita Nova.	Provided extraordinarily high quality German intelligence from sources in German to the group	Rote Drei Group		Survived the war	code name: Lucy. Joined the Rote Drei in September 1942.
Helmut Roloff	(1912–2001)	Pianist	Hid a number of shortwave radio transmitters in his parents' apartment	Schulze-Boysen Group	17 December 1942 and kept in the basement of Gestapo headquarters at Prince Albrecht Street with his hands tied behind his back	Sent to Spandau Prison after two weeks and wasn't released until 26 January 1943. Survived the war.	Had contact with the group through John Graudenz and Helmut Himpel. Provided his neighbours, the Jewish Kuttner family, critical moral and logistical support, risking his own life.
Henri de Ryck	(1910–1942)	Editor and publisher	Simexco shareholder		25 November 1942 in Brussels	Died at Mauthausen concentration camp	

== S ==
People of the Red Orchestra
Name	Life	Employment	Rote Kapelle or military position	Group	Arrested	Fate	Notes
Willy Sachse	(1896–1944)	Precision mechanic, sailor and writer	KPD Communist.	Robert Uhrig Group	Arrested February 1943	In June 1944 he was sentenced to death for treason and carried out on 21 August 1944 in the Brandenburg-Görden Prison	Linked to Beppo Römer.
Clara Schabbel	(1894–1943)	Shorthand typist	Founding members of the KPD. Worked in the Communist International underground organisation in Germany	Links to Trepper Group and Saefkow-Jacob-Bästlein Organization	Arrested on 18 October 1942 in Berlin	On 20 January 1943 the 2nd Senate of the Reichskriegsgericht announced the death penalty because of enemy favoritism. She was executed on Plötzensee Prison.	Mistress of Henry Robinson. Mother of Leo Schabbel.
Leo Schabbel					Arrested on 11 March 1943	Sentenced by the Reichskriegsgericht to 5 years in prison for knowing the activities of his mother	Son of Klara Schabbel
Philipp Schaeffer	(1894–1943)	German orientalist, librarian and sinologist		Schulze-Boysen Group	Arrested on 2 October 1942 in Berlin	On 6 February 1943, the 2nd Senate of the Reichskriegsgericht announced the death sentence for Preparing to commit high treason while aiding the enemy. Beheaded at Plötzensee Prison.	
Ilse Schaeffer	(1899–1972)	Sculptor	Communist and KPD member	Schulze-Boysen Group	Arrested on 2 October 1942 in Zernsdorf	On 6 February 1943, the 2nd Senate of the Reichskriegsgericht sentenced her for abetting treason in two cases to three years in prison.	Links to Schulze-Boysen Group through Fritz Cremer, Kurt Schumacher and Ruthild Hahne.
Friedrich Schauer	(1913–2007)	Architect	Took part in the counter demonstration at The Soviet Paradise including posting bills	Wilhelm Schürmann-Horster group	Arrested on 23 October 1942 in Berlin.	On 21 August 1943, the 2nd Senate of the People's Court sentenced him to eight years in prison.	Later linked to Harnack and Schulze-Boysen through Hans Coppi.
Heinrich Scheel	(1915–1996)	Scharfenberg student, historian	Replaced Hans Coppi and became very busy as a courier	Schulze-Boysen Group	Arrested on September 16, 1942 in Berlin	On 17 February 1943, Reichskriegsgericht sentenced him for non-disclosure of a crime of treason and treason and enemy privileges to five years penitentiary time. Able to hide the truth from the Gestapo about his activities, thereby saving his life.	
Rudolf von Scheliha	(1897–1942)	Diplomat who worked at the German Foreign Office	Furnished intelligence to Ilse Stoebe	Von Scheliha Group	Arrested on 29 October 1942 in Berlin	In December 1942, the 2nd Senate of the Reichskriegsgericht proclaimed the death penalty for treason.	
Marie Louise von Scheliha	(1904-2003)				Arrested on October 29, 1942 in Berlin		Wife of Rudolf von Scheliha. Fought to clear her husbands name after the war.
Lotte Schleif	(1903–1965)	Librarian	KPD member. Communist. Courier, copying documents, using own apartment for meetings.	Harnack Group	Arrested on 18 September 1942 in Berlin	On 6 February 1943, the 2nd Senate of the Reichskriegsgericht sentenced her, "because of preparation for high treason", to eight years in prison.	Married to Rudolf Bergtel. Also worked extensively the Schulze-Boysen Group. Wilhelm Guddorf was her contact for both groups. Worked with Philipp Schaeffer who was a librarian.
Renee Schwing		Simexco employee			Arrested November 1942	Deported to Germany	Mistress of Jindkinch Heinrich Rauch.
Friedrich Schlösinger	(1908–1942)	Interpreter and Soldier					Shot himself in a Russian farmhouse after learning of his wife's death. Husband of Rose Schlösinger.
Rose Schlösinger	(1907–1943)	Secretary at the Federal Foreign Office	SPD. Forwarded encrypted messages from Arvid Harnack to the radio operator Hans Coppi.	Harnack Group	Arrested on September 18, 1942 in Berlin	On 20 January 1943 the 2nd Senate of the Reichskriegsgericht announced the death penalty.	
Christian Schneider	(1896–1962)	Editor and translator	Swiss agent working with Hans Hausamann in Swiss Bureau Ha. Acted as a cutout between Rudolf Roessler (Lucy) and Rachel Dübendorfer (Sissy).	Rote Drei Group		Survived the war	Codename Taylor. Later worked for UNESCO in 1948.
Franz Schneider	(1900–1956)	Courier provided safehouses	Swiss Communist	Jeffremov Group	Arrested in October 1942 by the Gestapo and sent to Fort Breendonk.	Released by the Russians at the end of the war. Survived the war and moved back to Zurich in 1947.	Codenamed Niggi and possibly Chimor, a courier for the Jefremov Group. Husband of Germaine Schneider. Later worked for the Trepper Group. Also had link to the Harnack Group.
Germaine Schneider	(1903–1945)	Courier to France, Netherlands, Germany, Switzerland and the United Kingdom. Later courier between the Jeffremov group and Teppers Group in Paris.	Radio operator	Jeffremov Group sub-leader	Arrested on January 31, 1943 in Paris	Imprisoned until 30 November 1944 in Moabit Prison. Survived the war. Died of cancer on 12 November 1945.	Wife of Franz Schneider. Sister of Joséphine and Renee Clais, whom she recruited. Later worked for the Trepper Group, Lyons Group. Codenamed Clais, Pauline, Odette, Papillon and Schmeterling. Trained by Wenzel in radio transmission techniques.
Paul Scholz (Mahlow)	(1882–1976)	Construction contractor		Schulze Boysen Group	Arrested on 18 September 1942 in Berlin	On 30 January 1943 the Reichskriegsgericht condemned him for listening to foreign broadcasters. Scholz received a three-year jail sentence.	
Oda Schottmüller	(1905–1943)	Dancer, mask maker and sculptor	Hosted a transmitter in her apartment, although not verified. Distributed pamphlets	Schulze-Boysen Group	Arrested on 16 September 1942 in Berlin	On 26 January 1943, the 2nd Senate of the Reichskriegsgericht announced the death penalty for aiding and abetting the preparation of a treasonable enterprise and enemy favouritism.	Loosely associated with the Schulze-Boysen Group.
Hesekil Schreiber	(1899–1943)		Radio operator	Trepper Group, later Lyons Group	Arrested in December 1942		Codenamed Camille.
Wilhelm Schürmann-Horster	(1900–1943)	Actor		Schulze-Boysen Group	Arrested 29 October 1942 in Constance.	On 21 August 1943, the 2nd Senate of the People's Court pronounced the death penalty. He was hanged in Plötzensee Prison.	Part of Schulze-Boysen group through Hans Coppi
Hermann Schulz	(1890–1942)	Elementary school teacher		Schulze-Boysen Group		Sent to the Neuengamme concentration camp and later committed suicide	Linked to the Uhrig group
Kurt Schulze	(1894–1942)	Post worker, later naval radio operator	former KPD communist. Soviet agent of the GRU. Kept a transmitter in his house.	Schulze-Boysen Group, Harnack Group	Arrested on 16 September 1942 in Berlin	In December 1942 the death penalty was announced by the 3rd Senate of the Reichskriegsgericht and executed on the 22 September 1942.	Worked as a radio operator trainer and trained Hans Coppi.
Martha Schulze					Arrested on 16 September 1942 in Berlin	On 20 January 1943, the second senate of the Reichskriegsgericht announced a five-year prison sentence, "for not displaying a crime".	Wife of Kurt Schulze.
Harro Schulze-Boysen	(1909–1942)	Journalist, later lieutenant in Luftwaffe	Forwarded intelligence to the NKGB .	Schulze-Boysen Group	Arrested on 31 August 1942 in Berlin	The 3rd Senate of the Reichskriegsgericht announced on 19 December 1942 the death penalty and he was executed on the 22 December 1942	
Libertas Schulze-Boysen	(1913–1942)		Received a Soviet Agent Alexander Erdberg and introduced him to Schulze-Boysen, which kickstarted the Schulze-Boysen Group	Schulze-Boysen Group	Arrested on September 8, 1942 in Berlin	On 19 December 1943 the 3rd Senate of the Reichskriegsgericht announced the death penalty.	Wife of Harro Schulze-Boysen.
Elisabeth Schumacher	(1904–1942)	Graphic designer	Distributing pamphlets and leaflets. Documenting Nazi crimes. Sending letters to prominent individuals.	Shulze-Boysen Group	Arrested on 12 September 1942 in Berlin	On 19 December 1942 the 3rd Senate of the Reichskriegsgericht announced the death penalty.	Wife of Kurt Schumacher
Kurt Schumacher	(1905–1942)	Sculptor	Published a leaflet called Open Letter to the Eastern Front, helped an escaped prisoner and later housed the parachute agent Albert Hößler in his apartment.	Schulze-Boysen Group	Arrested on 12 September 1942 in Berlin	On 19 December 1942, the 3rd Senate of the Reichskriegsgericht announced the death sentence.	Husband of Elisabeth Schumacher
Otto Schumacher	(1909–?)		KPD	Jeffremov Group in 1942, later Lyons Group	Arrested 30 June 1942	Captured in early 1943 and executed.	Possibly worked for Gurevich. Fled Belgium to France and made contact with Hillel Katz.
Henri Marie Sidoine Ghislain Seghers	(1914–?)		One of the original shareholder in Simexco	Gurevich Group	Arrested on 24 November 1942 in Brussels	Detainee in Breendonk, Mauthausen and Dachau concentration camps.	Part of Gurevich Group but not aware of the group's activities. Good friend of Gurevich and Barcza who approached him to invest in Simexco.
Anne Saefkow							Wife of Anton Saefkow.
Anton Saefkow	(1903–1944)	German communist	Built the Saefkow-Jacob-Bästlein Organization that resisted in German munitions plants	Harnack Group	Arrested July 1944	On 5 September 1944 sentenced to death by Volksgerichtshof, executed on 18 September by guillotine at Brandenburg-Görden Prison	Linked to the Harnack's through Wilhelm Guddorf through Bernhard Bästlein.
Augustin Sésée	(?–1944)	Pianist	Agent and radio specialist	Trepper Group	Arrested on 25 August 1942 and sent to Fort Breendonk.	Beheaded in Berlin in January 1944	Later worked in the Gurevich Group as an assistant to Mikhail Makarov and later still Jeffremov Group. Betrayed by Maurice Peper.
Ernst Sieber	(1916–1994)	Railroad worker	Created sticky notes to post on walls and street lamps. Participated in the dissemination of the illegal paper, Die Innere Front (The Inner Front).	Harnack Group through John Sieg.	Arrested on August 14, 1944 in Küstrin	Charged in the People's Court for preparation for high treason,favoured by the enemy and war treason. Freed on 14 April 1945 in Bayreuth. Survived the war.	Later worked for several other groups in Berlin
John Sieg	(1903–1942)	Railroad worker	KPD member. Journalist who published Nazi atrocities in the Die Rote Fahne (The Red Flag).	Harnack Group through Adam Kuckhoff	Arrested on 11 October 1942 in Berlin	Sieg committed suicide on 15 October 15, 1942 in the Gestapo headquarters Prinz-Albrecht-Straße.	
Sophie Sieg (née Wloszczynski)	(1893–1987)	Shorthand typist			Arrested on 12 October 1942 in Berlin	In June 1943, she was taken to Ravensbrück concentration camp and was released on 30 April 1945 by the Red Army.	Wife of John Sieg.
Leo Skrzypczynski		Proprietor of a firm manufacturing Wireless Telegraphy components for the Luftwaffe		Harnack Group		Survived the war.	Became a high-level official in the Soviet Zone but became disillusioned with the Soviets and so started to pass secrets to the British Strategic Services Unit
Hendrika Smith			CPN member	Winterink Group			Ran a safe house
Pierre Jean De Soete	(1886–1948)	Belgian Sculptor and medalist	Agent and courier for Heinrich Rauch on Simexo business	Gurevich Group			Made a bust of Marshall Philippe Pétain, and later a bust of General Alexander von Falkenhausen. De Soete was an old friend of Guillaume Hoorickx.
Jacques Sokol	(1911–?)	Architect	Belgian communist	Trepper Group	Autumn 1942		Brother of Hersch Sokol
Hersch Sokol	(1908–1943)	Polish physician	Radio operator	Trepper Group	Arrested on 9 June 1942 near Paris	Tortured in Fort Breendonk and executed	Husband of Miriam Sokol
Miriam Sokol	(1908–1943)		Helped manage storing and distributing identity documents	Trepper Group		Sent to Fort Breendonk and executed	Wife of Hersch Sokol
Charles Spaak	(1903–1975)	Belgian screenwriter				Survived the war	The whole of the Spaak family was arrested on the orders of Heinz Pannwitz. Brother to Paul and Claude Spaak.
Jean Claude Spaak	(1904–1990)	Noted Belgian author and husband of Suzanne		Trepper Group	Attempt was made to capture Spaak in 1943 by the Gestapo but evaded arrest.	Survived the war	Husband of Suzanne Spaak. Leading member of the Trepper Group in France and close friend of Leopold Trepper and Georgie de Winter.
Lucie Spaak	(?–1944)						Daughter of Suzanne Spaak
Madeleine Spaak	(1895–1944)						Sister of Claude and Charles Spaak
Suzanne Spaak	(1905–1944)	Housewife	Typing and distributing leaflets. Later saved 60 Jewish children. Helped save Leopold Trepper.	Trepper Group	Arrested on 9 November 1943 in Brussels	In January 1944, she was sentenced to death and shot dead in her cell on 12 August 1944.	Initially worked in the French resistance. Heinz Pannwitz wrote a letter to Foreign Minister of the Belgian exile government in London to tell him that his sister-in-law had been taken to Germany for safety.
Georgette Savin	(1918–?)		Dealt in black market gold.				Married to German jeweler Hans Mussig who was French agent.
Jean Jaques Spiess	(1916–?)	Parisian Banker, representative of Zurich machine brokers	Communist, Radio operator	Rote Drei			Associate of Alexander Foote. Thought to be code named: Roger.
Alexander Spoerl	(1917–1978)	Writer, film and radio author	KPD Communist	Schulze-Boysen Group		Survived the war	Linked at the start of the Schulze-Boysen Group through Libertas Schulze-Boysen
Flora Van Springer	(1909–1943)			Gurevich group, then Lyons Group	Arrested on 19 December 1942 near Lyon	Sent to Plötzensee Prison where she was killed	Mistress of Isidor Springer. Real name Flora van Vliet.
Isidore Springer	(1912–1942)	Diamond dealer	Ran the 6th Trepper sub-network. Provided intelligence to Trepper from US and Belgian diplomats.	Trepper Group		Betrayed by Trepper. Committed suicide in 1942.	Worked as a recruiter and courier between Trepper and Gurevich. Leader of the Lyons Group. Had contacts with Belgian and US diplomats. Group codename was Romeo.
Gerhard Sredzki	(1917–1988)		KJVD	Saefkow-Jacob-Bästlein Organization		Survived the war	Husband of Gerda Sredzki. Son of Siegmund Sredzki.
Gerda Sredzki	(1917–1995)	Machine worker	KJVD	Saefkow-Jacob-Bästlein Organization		Survived the war	Wife of Gerhard Sredzki
Ilse Stöbe	(1911–1942)	Employee of the Foreign Office, journalist	Soviet agent who worked for the GRU	Von Scheliha Group	Arrested on 12 September 1942 by the Gestapo	On 14 December 1942, the 2nd Senate of the Reichskriegsgericht announced the death sentence for treason. Sent to Ravensbrück concentration camp where she died in 1943.	(code name "Alta").
Anna Staritsky	(1907–?)	Draftswomen and designer	Courier	Gurevich Group	Arrested 1 January 1942 but released	Survived the war	Mistress of Guillaume Hoorickx. Introduced to Hoorickx to Michail Makarov sometime in 1941. Eventually married Hoorickx after the war and lived in Paris.
Heinz Strelow	(1915–1943)	Journalist and later Non-commissioned officer	KJVD	Loose links to Schulze-Boysen Group via van Beek	Arrested 1 October 1942	On 18 January 1943 the 2nd Senate of the Reichskriegsgericht announced the death penalty.	Lover was Cato Bontjes van Beek in shared apartment
Hans Sussmann	(1897–1985)	Historian and politician	KPD, Communist. Created anti-fascist and anti-war leaflets.	Shulze-Boysen Group		Survived the war	Worked with Walter Küchenmeister and Albert Voigts

== T ==
People of the Red Orchestra
Name	Life	Employment	Rote Kapelle or military position	Group	Arrested	Fate	Notes
Maria "Mimi" Terwiel	(1910–1943)	Secretary	Wrote illegal leaflets and took part in attaching stickers at the Nazi propaganda exhibition, The Soviet Paradise. Provided food to hidden Jewish families.	Schulze-Boysen Group	Arrested on 17 September 1942 in Berlin	On 26 January 1943, the second senate of the Reichskriegsgericht announced the death sentence for the preparation of a treasonous enterprise and enemy favouritism. She was executed in Plötzensee Prison.	Her fiancé was Helmut Himpel and they were both devout Catholics. Considered by the Nazis to be first-degree Jewish mixed-race, meaning after 1941, her existence became increasingly fraught and she was at risk of being murdered.
Louis Thevenet	(1903–?)	Cigarette manufacturer			Arrested in November 1942	Died in prison sometime before April 1943	Uninvolved in the Red Orchestra. Anatoly Gurevich sold the remains of Simexco in July 1942.
Fritz Thiel	(1916–1943)	Precision mechanic	Took part in attaching stickers at The Soviet Paradise	Schulze-Boysen Group	Arrested on 16 September 1942 in Berlin.	On 18 January 1943, the Reichskriegsgericht announced the death penalty. He was executed on 13 May 1943 in Plötzensee Prison.	
Hannelore Thiel	(1924–1998)			Schulze-Boysen Group	Arrested on 16 September 1942 in Berlin	Sentenced to 6 years in prison at Ravensbrück concentration camp. Survived the war.	Wife of Fritz Thiel. Accused of holding a soviet radio in her apartment. Part of the Heillschen Abendschule group.
Wolfgang Thiess	(1911–1943)	Clerk	Communist. Designed leaflets and then distributed them. Painted slogans on walls.	Harnack Group	Arrested on 21 October 1942	Sentenced to death on 21 August 1943 by the 2nd Senate of People's Court for preparation for high treason. Killed in Plötzensee Prison .	Partner was Ruthild Hahne. Took part in The Soviet Paradise resistance.
Edwin Tietjens	(1894–1944)	Psychologist and author	Hid Jewish factory worker Ruth Heynemann and her mother in their home and procured fake papers	Schulze-Boysen Group			Alias: the Albanians. Authored a book with Adam Kuckhoff and is considered a prime example of literary camouflage.
Erhard Tohmfor	(1909–1943)	Chemist and engineer. Head of department at Loewe Radio AG.	Sabotaging the armaments industry	Schulze-Boysen Group and Harnack Group	Arrested at the end of November 1942	4th senate of the Reichskriegsgericht announced on January 27, 1943 the death penalty for aiding and abetting espionage.	His wife was Gertrud Tohmfor.
Alfred Traxl	(1912–1943)	Commercial clerk, then soldier	Sergeant in same unit as Horst Heilmann working with Referat 12	Schulze-Boysen Group	Imprisoned from 5 September 1942 to 18 May 1943	On 17 February 1943, the 2nd senate of the Reichskriegsgericht sentenced him on for military disobedience in coincidence with the disclosure of a state secret to five years in prison.	
Ella Trebe	(1902–1943)	Metal worker and trade unionist at AEG	KPD Communist. Worked as a courier in Europe.	Connected to Shulze-Boysen Group and Harnack Group through Wilhelm Guddorf	Arrested when a Soviet parachutist Ernst Beuthke she was hiding in her apartment was discovered	Sent to Sachsenhausen concentration camp and killed immediately	Friend of the Ernst Beuthke family. Killed on the same day as Dora Baumann, Anna Becker, Anna Beuthke, Charlotte Beuthke, Charlotte Hundt, and Lina Mueller, on 11 August 1943.
Leopold Trepper	(1904–1982)	Communist and Soviet intelligence officer	Discovered the plans for Operation Barbarossa in 1941	Established seven intelligence groups in Western Europe	On 24 November 1942 was arrested in Paris by Heinrich Müller	Managed to convince his captors to become double agents and finally escape	Codename Mikler. Took over the Foreign Excellent Raincoat Company from Leon Grossvogel. Was known as the Le Grand Chef.
Felix Tucholla	(1899–1943)	Locksmith.	KPD member. Courier. Distributed anti-nazi pamphlets. Provided accommodation for the Soviet parachutist, Erwin Panndorf.	Uhrig Group	Arrested 25 July 1942	People's Court sentenced the couple to death on 17 August 1943. Executed on 8 September 1943 in Plötzensee Prison.	Husband of Käthe Tucholla. Links to the Schulze-Boysen and Harnack Groups through Robert Uhrig via Wilhelm Guddorf.
Käthe Tucholla	(1910–1943)	Athlete and gymnast	Courier. Also provided accommodation for the Soviet parachutist, Erwin Panndorf, and later provided help build up his contacts.	Uhrig Group	Arrested on 25 July 1942 while visiting Meerane	People's Court sentenced the couple to death on 17 August 1943. Executed on 28 September 1943 in Plötzensee Prison.	Links to the Schulze-Boysen and Harnack Groups through Robert Uhrig via Wilhelm Guddorf. Wife of Felix Tucholla.

== U ==
People of the Red Orchestra
Name	Life	Employment	Rote Kapelle or military position	Group	Arrested	Fate	Notes
Carl Uelze	(1901–1985)	Merchant and executive	Communist, KPD. Organised resistance group at the Nordland Deutsche Schnee- und Gleitschutzkettenfabrik, GmbH.		Arrested on 1 December 1942. Released on 15 December 1942 after not being identified as part of the Red Orchestra by the Gestapo.	Survived the war	Husband of Hildegard Uelze. Reduced production at the Nordland Snow and Sliding Chain Factory.
Hildegard Uelze	(1915–1967)				Arrested along with her husband and Martin Weise. Released on 15 December 1942	Survived the war	Wife of Carl Uelze
Robert Uhrig	(1903–1944)	Toolmaker	KPD member. Recognised head of communist resistance up to 1940 and built a resistance network among more than 20 factories.	Uhrig Group	Arrested in February 1942 along with 200 members of his group	On 21 August 1944 guillotined at the Brandenburg-Görden Prison	Organised resistance groups in a number of German manufacturing plants that became the Uhrig Group. Linked to the Schulze-Boysen and Harnack Groups through contact with Wilhelm Guddorf and John Sieg. Also had contact with the Saefkow-Jacob-Bästlein Organization. Notable for publishing underground paper Informationdienst.

== V ==
People of the Red Orchestra
Name	Life	Employment	Rote Kapelle or military position	Group	Arrested	Fate	Notes
Marthe Angele Francoise Vandenhoeck	(1918–?)		Courier	Jeffremov Group	July 1942	Survived the war after being liberated from prison at the end of the war	Used to stage the arrest of Elizabeth Depelsenaire
Josephine Francoise Verhimst	(1887–?)		Courier	Jeffremov Group		Arrested with the Jeusseur in January 1943	Mistress of Jean Baptiste Jeusseur. Sent to work by her sister Germaine Schneider.
Jean-Pierre Vigier	(1920–2004)	League of Nations delegate and French physicist	Provided low grade intelligence to Rachel Dübendorfer	Rote Drei Group			Married Rachel Dübendorfer's daughter Tamara Vigier
Tamara Vigier	(1922–?)		Courier	Rote Drei Group		Sentenced to two years in jail in May 1944	Code name:Mara. Daughter of Rachel Dübendorfer and wife of Jean-Pierre Vigier.
Pierre Villon	(1901–1980)	Architect	French Communist Party member. Helped publish the communist L'Humanité newspaper.	Trepper Group		Survived the war	Coordinated part of the Trepper Group contacts with the Soviet Union
Käte Voelkner	(1906–1943)	Secretary	Provided blank forms, stamps and signatures for copying	Trepper Group	31 January 1943 in Paris by Sonderkommando Pannwitz	15 March 1943 after being tortured. Sentenced by Manfred Roeder at the Imperial War Court.	Passed her information to Trepper on tissue paper or in matchboxes
Hans Voelkner	(1928–2002)						Son of Käte Voelkner. Later became a GDR intelligence officer for most of the 1960s.
Henry Voelkner							Son of Käte Voelkner
Charlotte Vogt							Partner of the German Diplomat Gerhard Kegel
Albert Voigts	(1904–1943)	Patent engineer	Communist	Schulze-Boysen Group	October 1942 in Berlin	Sent to June 1943 in Sachsenhausen concentration camp and died on June 30, 1943	Heavily tortured by the Gestapo but never exposed his friends. Worked with Walter Küchenmeister, Hans Sussmann, and Elfriede Paul.

== W ==
People of the Red Orchestra
Name	Life	Employment	Rote Kapelle or military position	Group	Arrested	Fate	Notes
Karoline Wagner	(1916–?)		Member of SAP	Saefkow-Jacob-Bästlein Organization			Collaborated with Anton Saefkow in the 1930s, then Schulze-Boysens later in the 1930s and early 1940s
Max Waibel	(1901–1971)	Swiss Intelligence Officer	Passed military intelligence to the Soviet Union			Survived the war	Held the rank of Major. Headed the Intelligence Section 1 (NS-1, Rigi) of the Swiss Armed Forces. Later involved in the negotiations of Operation Sunrise.
Martin Weise	(1903–1943)	German journalist and lecturer	KPD member and courier.	After being released from jail in 1937 contacted his friend Wilhelm Guddorf to make contact with Bernhard Bästlein and Robert Abshagen to create and distribute illegal pamphlets including Organize the revolutionary mass struggle	Arrested on 1 December 1942 in Berlin	On 8 October 1943 the 2nd Senate of the People's Court condemned him to death because of preparation for high treason and because of enemy favouritism.	Later worked with John Sieg, Fritz Lange and Walter Husemann on The Inner Front
Günther Weisenborn	(1902–1969)	German writer, playwright and drama critic	Involved in writing and distributing subversive pamphlets	Schulze-Boysen Group	Arrested on 26 September 1942.	Testimony of a cellmate led to the reduction of his sentence from death to 10 years. Saved by the arrival of the Red Army.	Husband of Joy Weisenborn. In 1933, all his plays and books were burnt on the orders of Joseph Goebbels. By 1938 he was publishing so called between-the-lines literature that was indirectly critical of the Nazi regime. Also worked with the Harnack Group in resistance activities.
Joy Weisenborn	(1914–2004)	Singer			Arrested on 26 September 1942 along with her husband	Released on 12 April 1942. Survived the war	Wife of Günther Weisenborn, whom she met while staying at the Shulze-Boysens
Ernest David Weiss	(1902–1982)	Transport economist, later concert pianist	Soviet intelligence agent	Henry Robinson group		Interrogation started on 30 January 1948 by British intelligence. No action was taken against him by MI5.	Worked for Soviet intelligence from 1932 to 1939. Associated with Henry Robinson. Alias Walter Lock.
Johanna Weissensteiner	(1910–1969)	Dressmaker. Between 1940-1942 typist at the OKW.			Arrested on 16 September 1942 but released	Survived the war	Wife of Richard Weissensteiner
Richard Weissensteiner	(1902–1943)	Welder and technical draftsman	Communist who attended a number of meetings	Harnack Group, later Schulze-Boysen group	Arrested on 16 September 1942 in Berlin	On the 30 January 1943, the 2nd Senate of the Reichskriegsgericht announced the death penalty For the purpose of assisting in the preparation of high treason in concert with enemy favouritism. Executed on 13 May 1943 in Plötzensee Prison.	Had strong contacts with Hans Coppi and Erika Gräfin von Brockdorff and involved in discussions
Johann Wenzel	(1902–1969)	GRU agent	Wireless telegraphy specialist and trainer	Gurevich Group, then Trepper Group, later Jeffremov Group	Arrested 30 June 1942 and forced to take part in playback operation	Managed to escape through an unlocked door and survived the war	
Frida Wesolek	(1887–1943)	Housewife	KPD member, Communist. Operated a functional radio set that the family owned. Housed Soviet parachutists in her apartment.	Schulze-Boysen Group and von Scheliha Group	Arrested in October 1942	Sentenced to death by Manfred Roeder in spring 1943. Executed on 5 August 1943.	Had contacts with Adam Kuckhoff, Wilhelm Guddorf, and John Sieg as well as Gerhard Kegel and Ilse Stöbe Father was Emil Hübner.
Stanislaus Wesolek	(1878–1943)	Milling cutter	German KPD member	Schulze-Boysen Group			Husband of Frida Wesolek. Their apartment was used as a safe house.
Walter Wesolek	(1910–1942)	Technician	Young Communist International member	Schulze-Boysen Group	Arrested 18 September 1942	Release 12 April 1943	Grandson of Frida Wesolek
Johannes Wesolek	(1907–1942)	Radio technician		Schulze-Boysen Group	Arrested on 19 October 1942	On 28 May 1943, sentenced to six years in prison by the 2nd Senate of the Reichskriegsgericht for preparation to commit treason at the Brandenburg-Görden Prison. Saved by the Red Army.	Grandson of Frida Wesolek
Georgie de Winter		Professional dancer	Courier, recruiter and fringe member of group with no political convictions	Trepper Group	Arrested on 19 October 1943,	Deported to Ravensbrück concentration camp, the women's only concentration camp.	Accidentally exposed the Maximovitch Group as she had a letter from Antonia Lyon-Smith, when she was arrested. The mistress of Leopold Trepper, they had a son together, Patrick De Winter.
Anton Winterink	(1914–1944)	Dutch communist and active member of the Communist Party of the Netherlands	Lead member of Rote Hilfe. Ran his own agent network.	Group Hilda	Betrayed by Maurice Peper who was his liaison with Jeffremov. Arrested on 18 August 1942 by Piepe.	Shot in Brussels in July 1944	
Joseph Wirth	(1879–1956)	German politician and former Chancellor of Germany		Rote Drei Group		Survived the war	Messages sent by the Rote Drei indicate that Wirth was ambitious and had contact with the British, German, Russians and American in pursuit of a post-war position. Two of his intermediaries were Georges Blun and Louis Suss.
Vera Wulff	(1920–?)	Student and housewife	Housed Bernhard Bästlein in 1944 when he fled after the Bästlein-Jacob-Abshagen Group was broken up		Arrested on 5 July 1944	On 1 November 1944, the People's Court sentenced Wulff to 4 years in prison.	Father was Walter Glass; sister was Lucie Nix

== Y ==
No entries.

== Z ==
People of the Red Orchestra
Name	Life	Employment	Rote Kapelle or military position	Group	Arrested	Fate	Notes
Edouard Van Der Zyphen		Civilian employee in Hentschel factory		Jeffremov Group	December 1942		Code name:Nelly. Possibly surname called Zijpen. Considered the most important agent for the Jeffremov group.

== Literature ==
- Rosiejka, Gert (1986). Die Rote Kapelle : "Landesverrat" als antifaschist. Widerstand (1. Aufl ed.). Hamburg: Ergebnisse-Verlag. p. 80. ISBN 3-925622-16-0.
- Trepper, Leopold (1978). "Appendix 1 - Victims and survivors of the Red Chapel in Western Europe and Germany. Attempting a balance". The truth. Autobiography (in German) (Ungekürzte Ausg ed.). Munich: Deutscher Taschenbuch-Verlag. ISBN 3-423-01387-7.
- Griebel, Regina; Coburger, Marlies; Scheel, Heinrich (1992). Erfasst? : das Gestapo-Album zur Roten Kapelle : eine Foto-Dokumentation [Captured? The Gestapo album to the Red Chapel. A photo documentation]. Audioscop. ISBN 3-88384-044-0.
- Weisenborn, Günther (1981). Der lautlose Aufstand : Bericht über die Widerstandsbewegung des deutschen Volkes 1933-1945 [The silent uprising. Report on the resistance movement of the German people 1933-1945] (in German) (Nachaufl ed.). Frankfurt: Röderberg-Verlag. ISBN 3-87682-022-7.
- Oleschinski, Brigitte (1970). Gedenkstätte Plötzensee (2 ed.). Berlin: Dietz-Verlag. ISBN 3-926082-05-4.
