= Barnimstrasse women's prison =

German women's prison

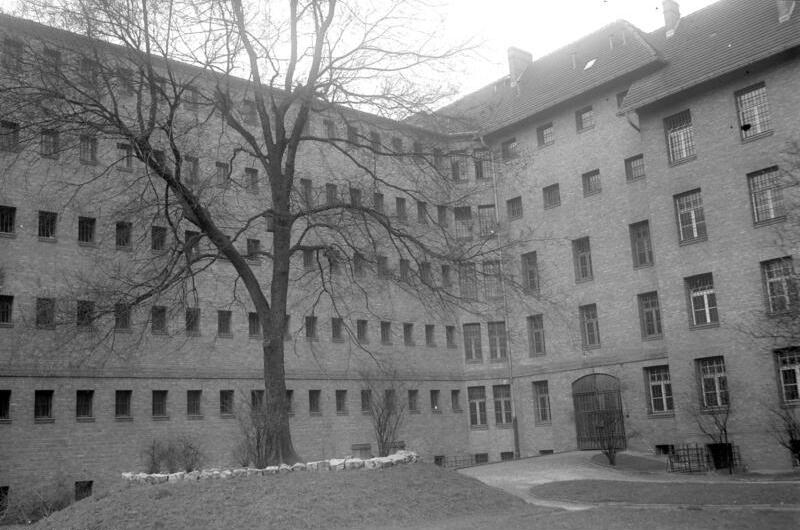
- Barnimstrasse women's prison in 1931
- Interactive map of Barnimstrasse women's prison
- Location: Friedrichshain, Berlin; 52.5248°N 13.4255°E
- Status: Closed
- Security class: Women's Prison
- Capacity: 357
- Population: 500 (end of World War II)
- Opened: May 1868
- Closed: 1974

Barnimstrasse women's prison was a women's prison that existed between 1868 and 1974 in Barnimstraße in the Friedrichshain district of Berlin, which belonged first to the Königsstadt and from 1920 to the Friedrichshain district.

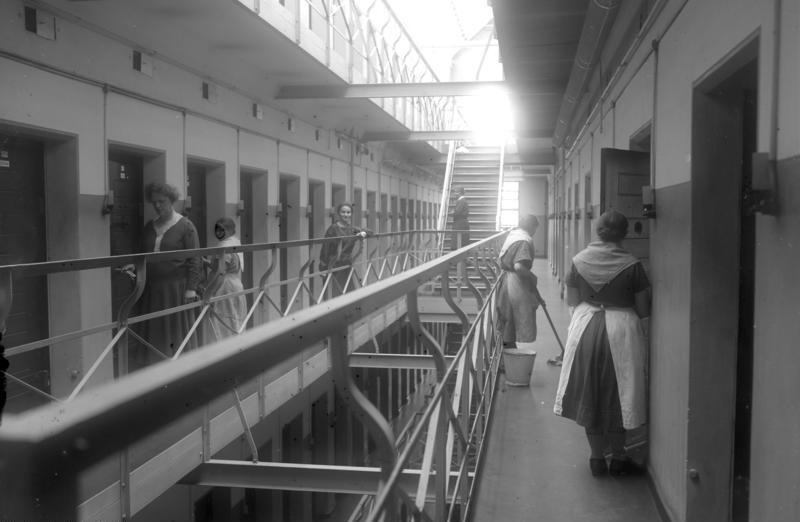
A view of the cell corridor in 1931

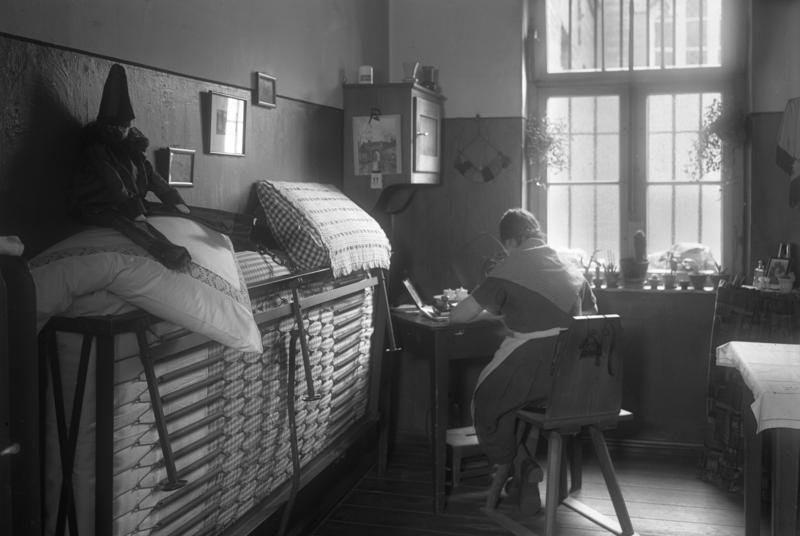
Interior view of the cell in 1931

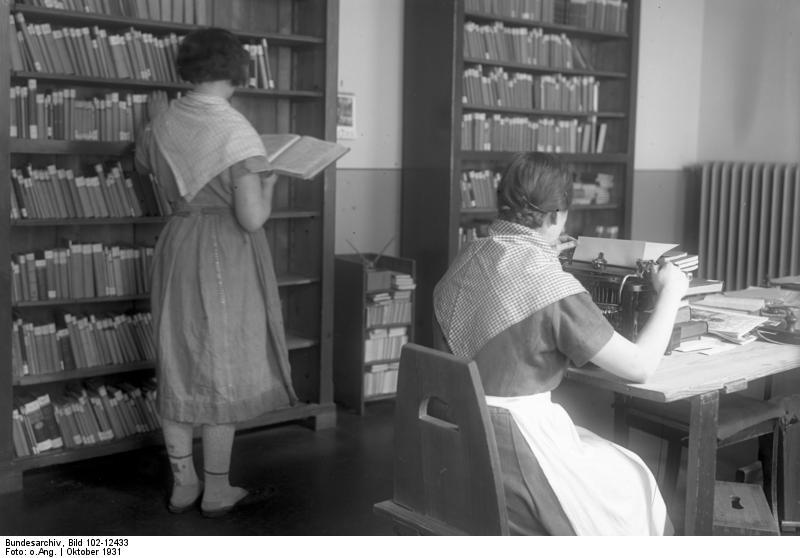
Library of Barnimstrasse. The typist has specific skills enabling her to fulfill this post

== Building history ==
New cell layout after the expansion and upgrade project, completed between the spring of 1910 and November 1913. The diagram describes both function of each cell and dimensions.

In 1864, a new debtors' prison was built in Berlin's royal city, north-east of today's Alexanderplatz, under the direction of architects Carl Johann Christian Zimmermann and Albert Cremer. After Prussia abolished imprisonment for debtors in May 1868, it was converted and extended to become the Royal Prussian Women's Prison.

In the spring of 1910, the prison was expanded with some reconstruction of the internal structure that was completed by November 1913. It was the most modern prison in the city and offered space for 357 inmates, and could even be increased to 500. This modification included the following changes:

- At the end of the street wing, closed from the other prison rooms, a new hospital for up to 38 sick people with a mother-and-child ward were built.
- A three-story building was constructed on the farm yard for the kitchen and utility rooms. The kitchen with its adjoining rooms was located on the second floor, the extensive rooms for the laundry on the first and second floors. The laundry processed around 1500 kilogrammes of laundry per day. In addition to that of the company's own company, laundry from the city bailiff's prison and almost all of Berlin's court authorities were processed. That necessitated a large number of washing machines.
- Two cast-iron low-pressure steam boilers were installed for the laundry machines, each of which were powered by a 10 hp electric motor.
- Two electrically operated elevators were installed to transport laundry along with a seventeen-axis steam drying device. Heating took place in the usual way in prisons, using hot water heating. The hospital had a special system: the service building was heated by low-pressure steam heating system. A hot water preparation system is installed for the various bathrooms.
- In order to ensure extensive cleanliness, rinsing laboratories with group rinsing facility were set up in all cells, and all cells also received electrical lighting.
- A vacuum formalin dry cleaner which could hold an entire bed and also contain fur and feathers was added.

For the architecture of the extension, brick was also chosen in a color that was as close as possible to the old stone, following on from the old building, which had an English-Gothic design (Fig. 2). Both street fronts were designed in the same way. The long front on Weinstrasse was designed with the five-story central building with the large windows of the overview corridor in such a way that the purpose of the building is hardly visible.

The construction costs, including the actual construction management, amounted to around 761,000 marks, of which 101,000 marks went to the renovation of the old building: plus around 110,000 marks for the interior furnishings. so that the total costs were around 871,000 marks.

The buildings survived the bombing raids and hostilities at the end of the World War II with only minor damage. However, due to the work opportunities in a neighboring industrial laundry, a new women's prison was built in Köpenick in 1974. The buildings on Barnimstrasse were subsequently demolished. The site was initially used as a sports ground with a gymnasium, concrete floor and jumping pit, and in the 1990s a traffic education facility was established.

== Detention ==
=== Monarchy and Weimar Republic ===
During the monarchy, the prison was primarily occupied by petty criminals, including many prostitutes which were in the majority by 1933. The number of new inmates who were prostitutes began to decline in 1927 due to the "Reich Law to Combat sexually transmitted diseases" (Reichsgesetz zur Bekämpfung der Geschlechtskrankheiten) being introduced that made prostitution exempt under certain conditions. Up until 1926, abortion was punishable by up to 10 years in prison. As a result of the socialist laws and the anti-war movement of World War I, women were also imprisoned for political reasons. The German Marxist and anti-war activist Rosa Luxemburg was imprisoned in Barnimstrasse in 1907 and 1915-1916 for giving an anti-war speech.

Inside the prison buildings, it was compulsory to wear institutional clothing, which consisted of a clean blue wash dress with a white and blue neckerchief and blue knitted wool stockings with a red stripe. For cooler days there was a blue jacket with the old sleeve cut. The women responsible for preparing food had to cover their hair with a white cloth.

Anyone who was sentenced to more than six months in prison was placed in a three-tier system, the different levels of which gave the prisoners some advantages over the other women, including that the lights were allowed to stay on longer in the cell and a second book from the prison library was also allowed per week. With good behavior, prisoners could work their way up. Particular consideration was given to imprisoned mothers with children: they lived with their children in a mother's cell that contained toys and flowers were also allowed to be placed here. A doctor came once a day to check on everything.

=== National Socialism ===
During the period of Nazism, the prison served as a Gestapo remand prison and as a stopover between the Plötzensee Prison execution site and other prisons and camps. Pregnant women gave birth here before being executed. Hans Coppi Jr. and Anita Leocádia Prestes, for example, were born here. Over 300 women of the resistance started their final journey from here, including:

A–D
Judith Auer	Marianne Baum	Lina Beckmann	Olga Benario-Prestes	Liane Berkowitz
Cato Bontjes van Beek	Erika von Brockdorff	Eva-Maria Buch	Hilde Coppi
E–H
Anna Ebermann	Charlotte Eisenblätter	Katharina Fellendorf	Ursula Goetze	Helene Gotthold
Auguste Haase	Liselotte Herrmann	Frieda Horstbrink
I–P
Else Imme	Hildegard Jadamowitz	Wanda Kallenbach	Johanna Kirchner	Helene Knothe
Sala Kochmann	Annie Krauss	Ingeborg Kummerow	Vera Obolensky
Q–T
Galina Romanova	Klara Schabbel	Pelagia Scheffczyk	Rose Schlösinger	Elfriede Scholz
Oda Schottmüller	Maria Terwiel	Elisabeth von Thadden	Käthe Tucholla	Elfriede Tygör
U–Z
Käte Voelkner	Elli Voigt	Frida Wesolek	Irene Wosikowski	Emma Zehden

They include women from well-known resistance groups and movements:

- The resistance groups of the Red Orchestra included: Käte Voelkner, Frida Wesolek, Käthe Tucholla, Maria Terwiel, Rose Schlösinger, Oda Schottmüller, Klara Schabbel, Annie Krauss, Ingeborg Kummerow, Krystana Iwanowa Janewa, Katharina Fellendorf, Else Imme, Ursula Goetze, Cato Bontjes van Beek, Erika von Brockdorff, Eva-Maria Buch, as well as Hilde Coppi and Liane Berkowitz, who were both pregnant at the time of their arrest.
- The Berlin workers' resistance included: Judith Auer, Marianne Baum, Gerda Boenke, Anna Ebermann, Charlotte Eisenblätter, Charlotte Garske, Auguste Haase, Elli Hatschek, Hella Hirsch, Hildegard Jadamowitz, Marianne Joachim, Sala Kochmann, Krista Lavíčková, Hildegard Loewy, Hildegard Margis, Hanni Meyer, Galina Romanova, Elfriede Tygör, Elli Voigt, Irene Walter, Suzanne Wesse and others
- In connection with the assassination attempt on Hitler known as the 20 July plot: Elisabeth Charlotte Gloeden and her mother Elisabeth Kuznitzky
- Members of the Resistance: Johanna Kirchner, Vera Obolensky, Ruth Oesterreich, Irene Wosikowski
- The underground Jehovah's Witnesses (Zeugen Jehovas) included: Helene Gotthold, Klara Stoffels, Auguste Hetkamp
- In connection with the Polish intelligence department "Stragan": Pelagia Scheffczyk, Gertruda Świerczek

== Post war period ==
In the post-war years, black market transactions and theft of food or other everyday items or for example theft of ration cards were the most common reasons for imprisonment. by 1947, the prison become so overcrowded to an extent that more than two-thirds of the prisoners had to sleep on the floor. Due to rationing in Germany, basic necessities like soap were extremely limited.

When Berlin was split into different administrative zones, the prison administration was reorganised to fit the new reality. From 1949 staff who lived in the British and America sectors were no longer allowed to visit Barnimstrasse, while prisoners from those secors who would have formerly have been jailed there, were now sent to Lehrterstrasse Prison. Due to a lack of men's prison capacity in the Soviet administrative zone, Barnimstrasse had to accommodate male prisoners. In 1949, an attempt to reform prison practices was made. Prisoner education was introduced and prisoner self-administration without guards was tried.

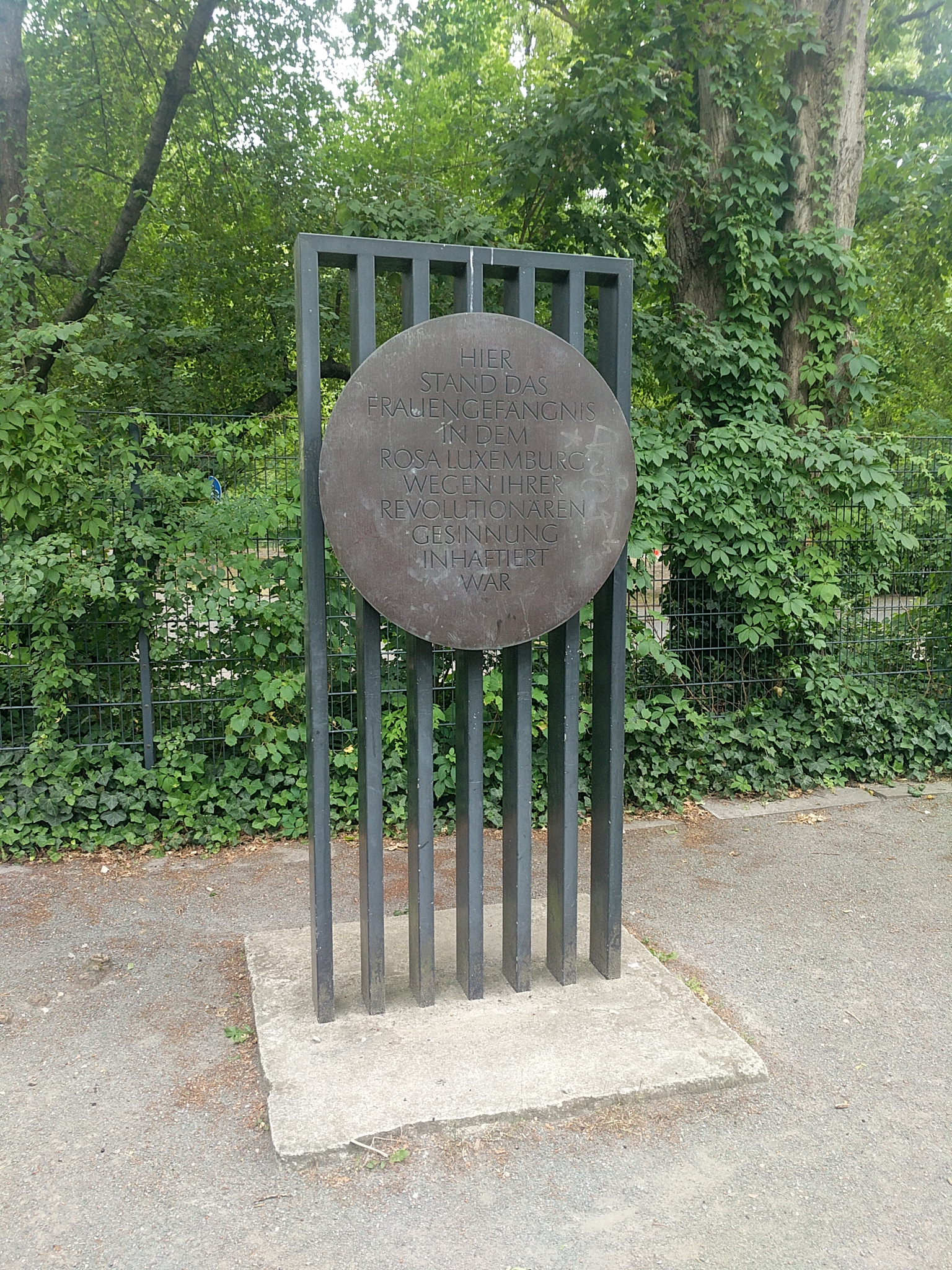
Monument to Rosa Luxemburg

In January 1951, the Volkspolizei assumed responsibility for the penal system in East Germany, resulting in all penal reform attempts in the previous years coming to an end and the introduction of a repressive regime in Barnimstrasse. The managerial staff at Barnimstrasse were replaced with politically reliable communists.

From 1949 to when the prison closed in 1974, no statistics on prisoners offences were kept. However, from the 1950s to the early 1960s, criminal offences for "antisocial behavior" and political offences "incitement to boycott" defined under Article 6 of the GDR constitution and "flight from the republic", "attempted flight" and "preparing for flight" were added. In the second-half of the 1960s, some prisoners were subject to compulsory labour re-education.

In the early 1960s with prison inmate numbers declining and concomitant lack of maintenance that resulted in a large rat infestation, plans were made to relocate it. In 1974, it was finally closed.

== Memorials ==
A memorial cell for Rosa Luxemburg was set up in the prison as early as 1950. After the buildings were demolished, a small memorial was erected in front of a neighboring school in Weinstraße in 1977. A plaque on the stele, reminiscent of prison bars, reads:

"Here stood the women's prison where Rosa Luxemburg was imprisoned for her revolutionary beliefs."

The resistance fighters were not commemorated at this point during the GDR era. Therefore, a temporary memorial plaque was installed in March 1994, the text of which read:

"Many resistance fighters against National Socialism were imprisoned in the Barnimstrasse women's prison between 1933 and 1945. For more than three hundred women, this was the last stop before their execution in Plötzensee. They were murdered because they distributed leaflets, helped those being persecuted, listened to foreign broadcasters, expressed doubts about the “final victory” or committed minor crimes for which the Nazi judiciary sentenced them to death as “public pests”. The building continued to be used as a women's prison after 1945 and was demolished in 1974."

After this plaque was vandalized, another memorial plaque was unveiled in 1996 with the following text:

"The Barnimstrasse women's prison stood on this site until 1974. Between 1933 and 1945, it was the last stop for more than 300 female resistance fighters against National Socialism before their execution in Plötzensee."

Several resolutions were passed by the person responsible in the district administration, the first in 1993, to redesign the memorial, but these have not yet been implemented. However, an art competition was announced in 2007, which was decided on in April 2008. The winner was Christoph Meyer with an "audio path through a prison for women and 5 political systems". The audio path was opened on 30 May 2015.

== Bibliography ==
- Ziegel, Dorothea (25 April 1929). "Barnimstraße 10: Ein Besuch im Berliner Frauengefängnis" (in German). Leipzig: Brockhaus-Verlag. Deutsche Allgemeine Zeitung.
