= Clara Schabbel =

Soviet intelligence officer

- Clara Schabbel as a young woman
- Born: 9 August 1894; Berlin
- Died: 5 August 1943 (aged 48); Berlin
- Occupation: Soviet intelligence officer
- Known for: Soviet Red Orchestra ("Rote Kapelle")
- Espionage activity
- Country: Germany
- Allegiance: Young Communist International (1924–1929); Young Communist League of Germany (1921); Communist International (Comintern) (1929-1943)
- Service years: 1924–1943

Clara Schabbel (born 9 August 1894 in Friedrichshain, Berlin, died 5 August 1943 in Plötzensee Prison) was a German communist and Soviet intelligence officer. During the 1920s and 1930s, Schabbel lived with Henry Robinson, a comintern agent who ran an espionage network that operated between France, Great Britain and Switzerland. Schabbel, working from a house in Hennigsdorf, became the main liaison between the German communist party (KPD) and Johann Wenzel, a radio operator who assisted and also transmitted intelligence for the KPD. However, her clandestine work was eventually discovered and she was arrested by the Gestapo in October 1942 and executed in August 1943 in Plötzensee Prison.

== Life ==
Clara Schabbel was the daughter of rope maker Ludwig Schabbel and his wife Emilie Pauline, née Borchert. Her birthplace was located at what was then Landsberger Straße 14 (today approximately Platz der Vereinigte Nationen 26) Both her parents were politically aligned with the Social Democratic Party of Germany (SPD).

== Career ==
After finishing primary school, Schabbel attended evening classes where she studied stenography, typography and business studies. In 1908, she began an apprenticeship as a saleswomen for the jewellers and silversmiths Richard Lebram, selling gold, silver jewellery and watches. In 1917, Schabbel began working for Telefunken company.

At a relatively young age Schabbel became politically active in the socialist working class youth of Berlin. In 1912 she joined the Socialist Workers' Youth. In 1914, Schabbel joined the centre-left SPD. During World War I her political views crystallised and she joined the communist Spartacus League led by Karl Liebknecht and Rosa Luxemburg. On 18 March 1917, she attended her first demonstration at Cemetery of the March Fallen to support solidarity with the February Revolution in Russia. While there she was arrested by the police. Through contacts in the Spartacus League she became associated with the International Communists of Germany and then by December 1918 a founding member of the Communist Party of Germany (KPD).

After the war she worked for a year as a stenographer at the German workers' and soldiers' councils 1918–1919. Between 1919 and 1920, Shabbel worked at the Western European Secretariat of the Communist International (Comintern) in Berlin.

In 1920, Schabbel became a member of Young Communist League of Germany (KJVD, Jugendinternationale). In the same year, she became a stenographer for a Berlin housing company before moving to work in the same position in the publishing house of the KJVD, a position she held until 1924. In 1920, she met the Belgian communist and KJVD member Arnold Schnee while working at the KJVD. Schnee would later became a Comintern and then the GRU agent working under Henry Robinson. The couple's son Leo was born in 1922. (Note: Sources vary. Kesaris reports that the sons name was Victor. Bourgeois, the most authoritive source states his name was Leo Schabbel.) By 1920, Schabbel was an ardent communist and was a delegate to the 10th Congress of the Russian Communist Party in March 1921.

In 1923, Schabbel along with her husband, who worked in the KPD, conducted subversive military and political work in the Rhineland and Ruhr districts of Germany. The work was part of the failed communist uprising in Germany known as German October that began in October 1923. Schabbel was unaffected by the failure but her husband Henry Robinson was sentenced by a French court to 10 years in prison In Absentia. Between 1923-1924, Schabbel worked as stenographer at the Young Communist International (KIM). In 1924, Schabbel moved to Moscow to work at the reconnaissance office of the Red Army and then in Executive Committee of the Communist International. On 11 April 1925, she became a member of the 14th Congress of the All-Union Communist Party. While in Moscow she lived with her son in the Hotel Lux. In June 1925, Schabbel moved back to Berlin where she worked as a stenographer for the Soviet-German oil company Nafta. In Berlin, Schabbel was politically inactive. In 1926, she became a member of the Comintern. In 1928, she became the PA to the company director and moved to the Hennigsdorf area of Berlin. In 1931, Schabbel moved to working in the oil trading department of Nafta. In 1933, Schabbel took a position as a stenotypist at Manganexport in Berlin. (Note: Manganexport was a Berlin based, Soviet controlled company that sold the mineral Manganese from Georgia.)

== Resistance ==
During the early Nazism period in 1935, Schabbel worked as a stenotypist at the AEG steel and rolling mill company in Hennigsdorf in Berlin, first in the company design bureau then in AEG's department of transport, a position she held until 1942 As a resistance fighter in the Comintern, Schabbel maintained a discreet life as the clandestine head of the German communist party. Amongst her duties was to act as liaison between the underground KPD and Johann Wenzel, a GRU agent and radio man of a Soviet espionage network in Europe later known as the Red Orchestra ("Rote Kapelle"). She also used her apartment during the war as a safehouse. In June 1942 for example, Schabbel was visited by Soviet agents Erna Eifler and Wilhelm Fellendorf, who had parachuted into Germany to contact members of a Berlin-based resistance organisation and to conduct espionage operations. Schabbel hid the agents for several days before moving them on.

== Arrest ==
Schabbel was arrested on 18 October 1942 in Berlin. At the end of a trial that lasted from 28 to 30 January 1943, Schabbel was sentenced by the 2nd Senate of the Reichskriegsgericht to the death penalty 'because of enemy favoritism'. On 5 August 1943, Schabbel was executed in Plötzensee Prison on the same day as Ursula Goetze, Liane Berkowitz, Eva-Maria Buch, Anna Krauss, Hilde Coppi, Maria Terwiel, Else Imme, Cato Bontjes van Beek, Oda Schottmüller, Rose Schlösinger, Frida Wesolek and Ingeborg Kummerow were executed.

In her last letter to relatives she stated:

"Dear girls, dear brother-in-law, dear nephews and nieces, I send you a farewell greeting today. My time is up. Don't worry, I'll soon be over it all. Thank you so much for your love... I'm not afraid and I'll die peacefully. Keep a place for me in your hearts. Give my regards to all my friends you still know and see. Stay healthy, and may you all spend many more happy hours together. I hope the war will end soon... So farewell, farewell. I send you all my deepest kisses in my thoughts. Your sister, sister-in-law, and Aunt Klara."

On 11 March 1943, Schabbels son, Leo Schabbel, a Wehrmacht soldier was arrested. His arrest resulted from the Nazi German tradition of Sippenhaft, the idea that a family or clan shares the responsibility for a crime or act committed by one of its members. He had been wounded by a russian grenade in Sevastopol and was in a hospital bed, severely underweight with a fever, when he was arrested. After being interrogated by the Gestapo, he was sentenced to 5 years in prison by the imperial court.

== Interview ==
In February 1995, Leo Schabbel was interviewed by the French writer and academic Guillaume Bourgeois. Schabbel stated that his mother's main contact was NKVD resident in Berlin, Aleksandr Mikhaylovich Korotkov known as Alexander Erdberg.

== Awards and honours ==
In 1969, Schabbel was posthumously decorated with the Soviet Order of the Patriotic War, 2nd class.

=== Odonymy ===
In the Biesdorf area of the borough of Marzahn-Hellersdorf of Berlin, a street was renamed Klara Schabbel Strasse.

=== Monuments ===
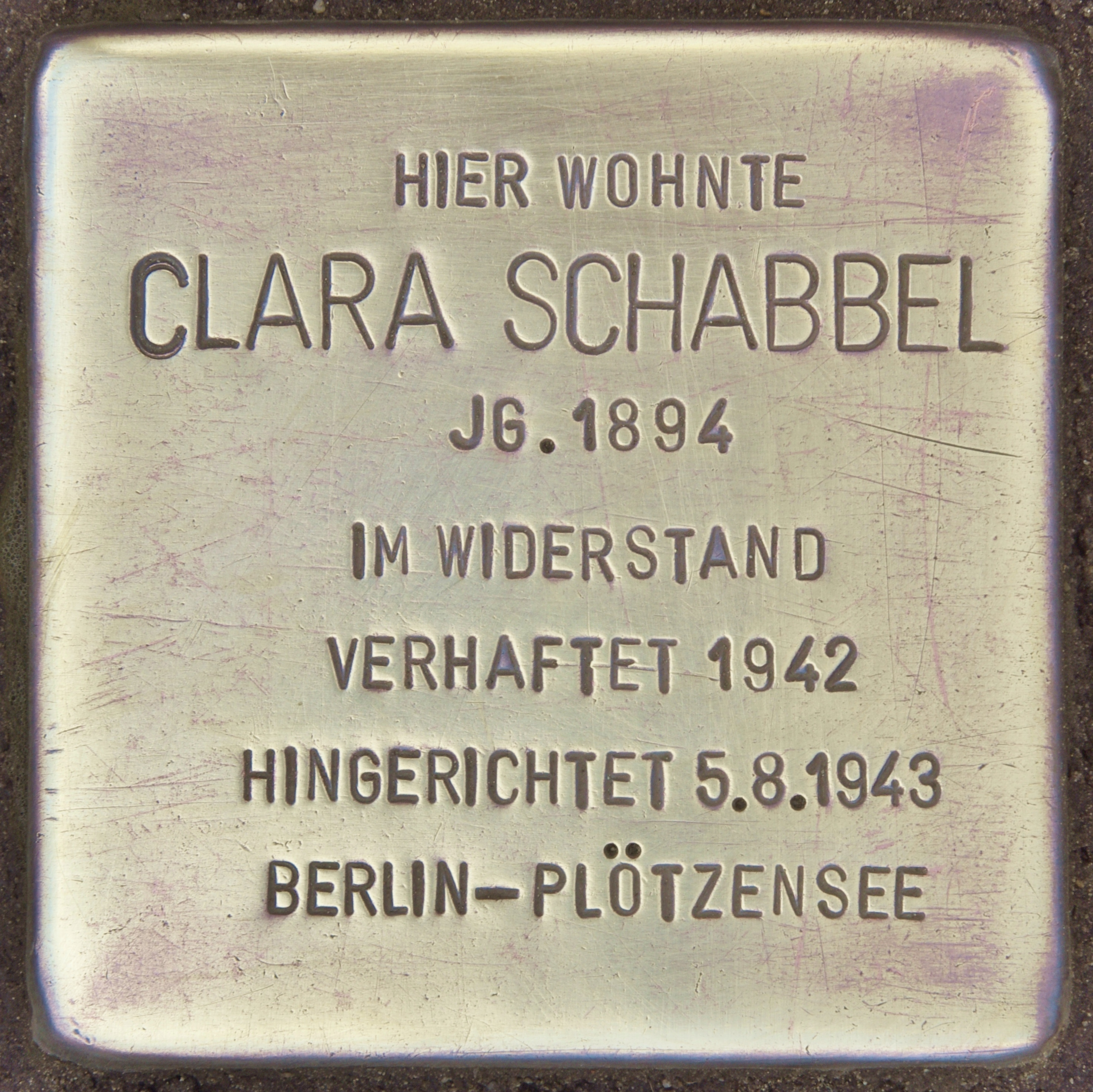
Stolperstein placed in Hennigsdorf to honour Schabbel

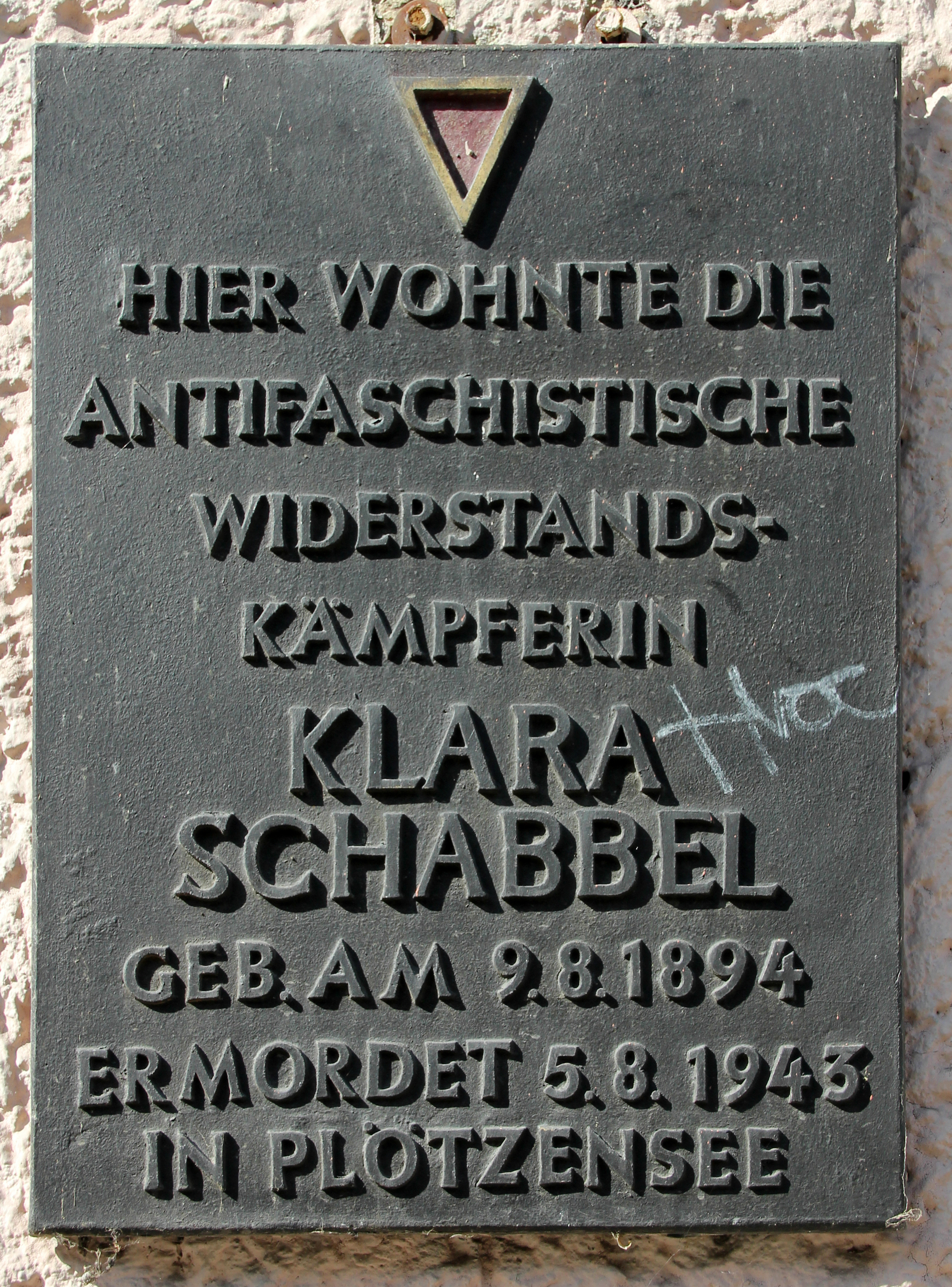
In 1976, a memorial plaque to Schabbel was placed at 63 Conrad-Blenkle-Straße, Prenzlauer Berg in Berlin

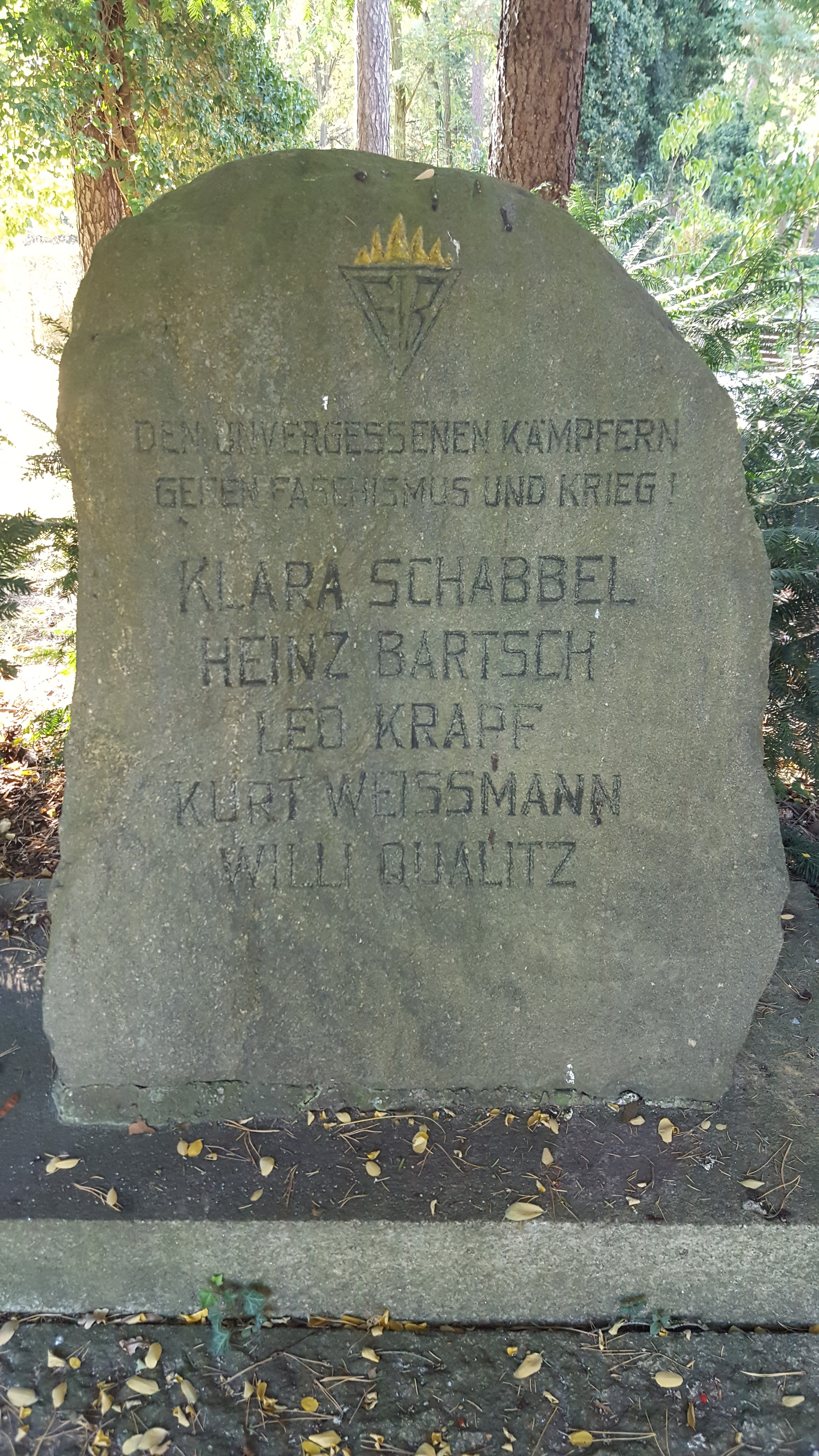
Schabbel's gravestone in Hennigsdorf Forest Cemetery

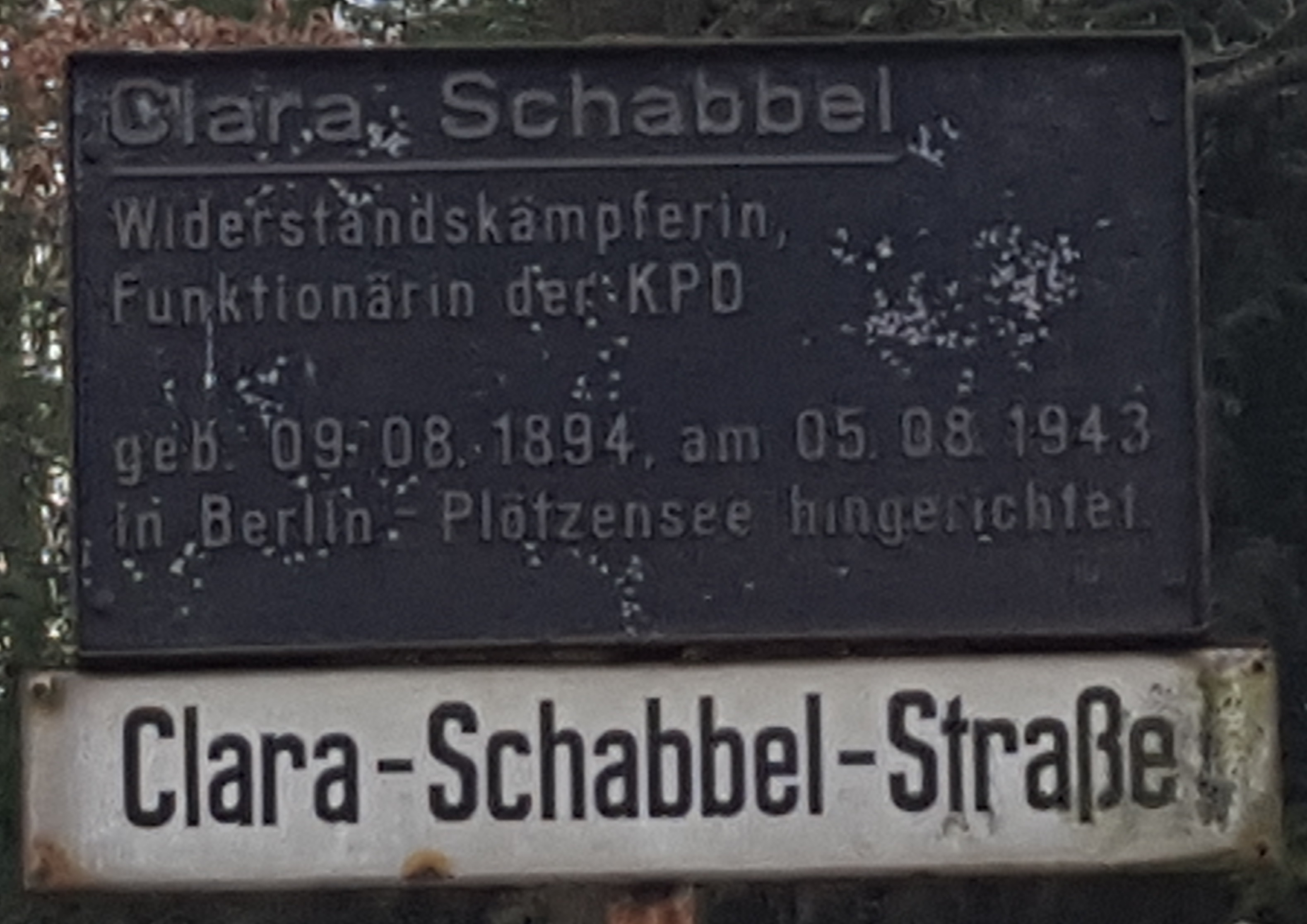
Memorial plaque to Schabbel with street sign in Hennigsdorf from the 1980s
