= Agnes Wabnitz =

German tailor and orator (1841–1894)

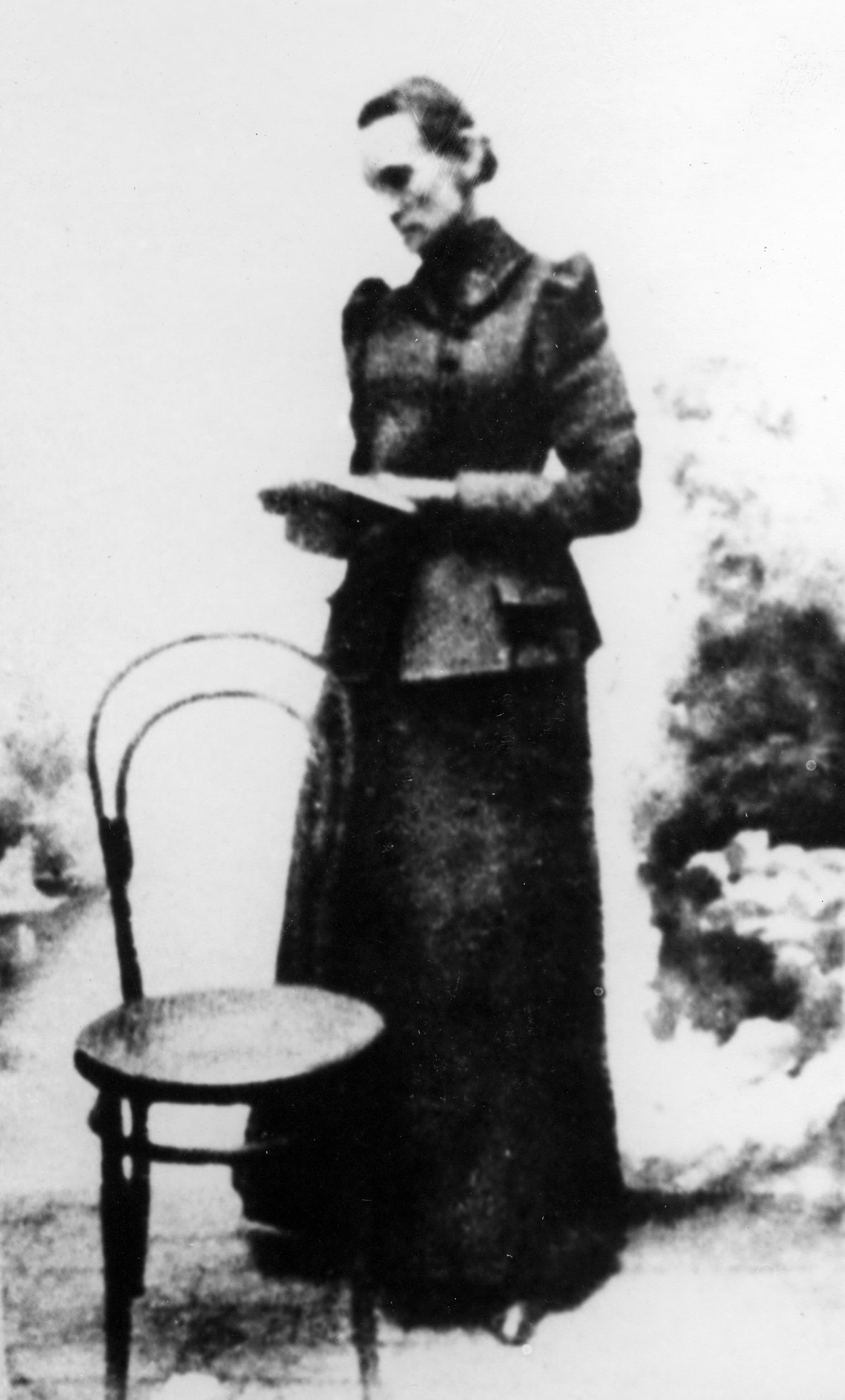
Agnes Wabnitz circa 1892.

Agnes Wabnitz (10 December 1841-28 August 1894) was a German political orator, tailor, and union organizer. She was an organizer with the Social Democratic Party of Germany, frequently delivering speeches on its behalf. She died by suicide while incarcerated at the Barnimstrasse women's prison. Her funeral was attended by tens of thousands of people.

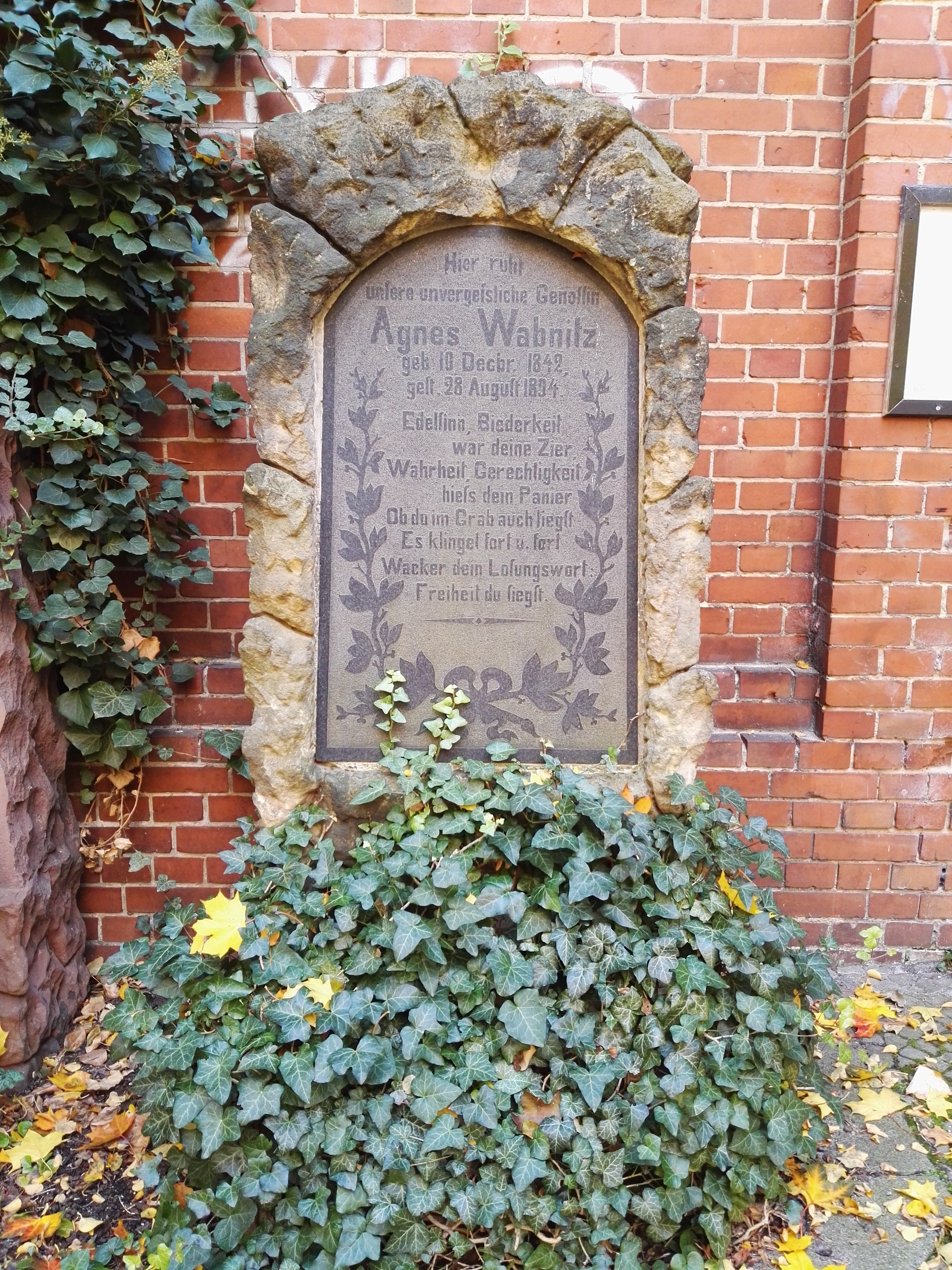
Grave stone of Agnes Wabnitz.
