= Johann Zimmermann =

Johann or Hans Zimmermann may refer to:

== Writers ==
- Johann Jacob Zimmermann (1642–1693), German nonconformist theologian, mathematician and astronomer
- Johann Georg Zimmermann (1728–1795), Swiss philosophical writer, naturalist and physician
- Johann Heinrich Zimmermann (1741–1805), German oceanic explorer and chronicler

== Public officials ==
- Johann Christian Zimmermann (1786–1857), German businessman, diplomat and politician
- Hans Zimmermann (1906–1984), German public official during Hitler era

== Others ==
- Johann Baptist Zimmermann (1680–1758), German Baroque painter
- Hans Zimmermann (architect) (1831–1911), German chief of works

== See also ==
- Zimmermann, German surname meaning "carpenter"
- Johannes Zimmermann (disambiguation)
- Hans Zimmer (1957–), German film composer and music producer
