= Frida Schottmüller =

Curator and art historian (1872–1936)

- Born: August 21, 1872; Berlin, Germany
- Died: June 12, 1936 (aged 63); Berlin, Germany
- Education: University of Zürich (Ph.D.)
- Occupation: Curator
- Relatives: Oda Schottmüller (niece)

Frida Schottmüller (21 August 1872 – 12 June 1936) was a curator and art historian of the Italian Renaissance. As a curator, she is notable for developing the concept of the "period room" in museology.

Schottmüller was born in Berlin on 21 August, 1872, the second child of Konrad (1841–1893) and Emma (née Wittich) Schottmüller. In 1893 she enrolled in the drawing school of the Verein der Berliner Künstlerinnen (Association of Berlin Women Artists) and at the Royal School of Art in Berlin. She entered the University of Berlin in 1899 studying art history under Heinrich Wölfflin. In 1903 she moved to the University of Zürich which granted her a Ph.D. thesis, still written under Wölfflin, who was a Swiss citizen. Her dissertation topic was the Renaissance sculptor Donatello.

Schottmüller accepted a position in the Italian Renaissance division at the Kaiser Friedrich-Wilhelm Museum (now the Bode Museum). The department was building one of the finest Renaissance collections under its director, Wilhelm von Bode. For Bode, Schottmüller wrote the index for his published photo collection, Denkmäler der Renaissance-Sculptur Toscanas, which Bode was completing issuing in over 100 parts in 1905. She helped developed the "period room" concept for displaying Renaissance art where objects were set in a historical and cultural context. She spent the final years of World War I, 1917-1918, at the Kunsthistorisches Institut in Florenz where she wrote catalogs for the museum's Spanish and Baroque sculptures, as well as for private collectors in Berlin. She also contributed entries to the Allgemeines Lexikon of Felix Becker and Ulrich Thieme. Among her apprentices at the museum were the budding Donatello scholar Jenö Lányi. Late in her career she completed the catalog of the Italian and Spanish sculpture, Die italienischen und spanischen Bildwerke der Renaissance und des Barock. Volker Krahn assesses that "Schottmüller's writings on the domestic culture of the Italian Renaissance remain exemplary". Apart from the brief period in Florence, she remained at the Kaiser Friedrich-Wilhelm Museum her entire career.

Schottmüller died in Berlin on 12 June 1936.

== Selected works ==
- Die Gestalt des Menschen in Donatelles Werk. Zürich, 1904 (dissertation; in German)
- Donatello: ein Beitrag zum Verständnis seiner künstlerischen Tat. Munich: Bruckmann, 1904 (in German)
- with Bode, Wilhelm. Denkmäler der Renaissance-Sculptur Toscanas in historischer Anordnung. Sonderdruck der Register. Munich: F. Bruckmann, 1905 (in German)
- Daniel Chodowiecki. Bielefeld: Velhagen & Klasings, 1912 (in German)
- "Der Europateppich im Kaiser-Friedrich-museum". Forschungen aus den Königlichen museen zu Berlin; Wilhelm von Bode zum 70. Geburtstage. Berlin: G. Grote, 1915 (in German)
- Bronze Statuetten und Geräte. Berlin: R.C. Schmidt & Co., 1918 (in German)
- Wohnungskultur und Möbel der italienischen Renaissance. Stuttgart: J. Hoffmann, 1921 (in German)
- Furniture and Interior Decoration of the Italian Renaissance. New York: B. Westerman Co., 1922 (in English)
- Fra Angelico da Fiesole: des Meisters Gemälde. Stuttgart und Leipzig, Deutsche Verlags-Anstalt, 1924 (in German)
- The Work of Fra Angelico da Fiesole reproduced in three hundred and twenty-seven illustrations, with a Biographical Introduction. New York: Brentano’s, 1921 (in English)
- Die Sammlung Dr. Eduard Simon, Berlin. 3 vols. Berlin: P. Cassirer, H. Helbing, 1929 (in German)
- Die italienischen und spanischen Bildwerke der Renaissance und des Barock. Berlin: Walter de Gruyter & Co., 1930 (in German)
