= Hansheinrich Kummerow =

German scientist and resistance fighter

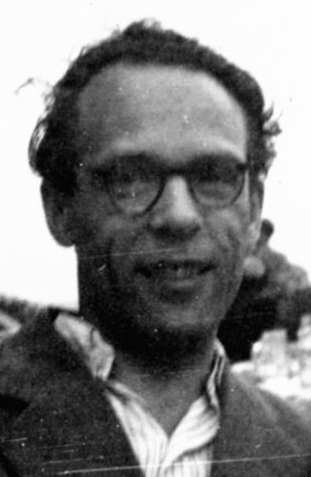
- Hansheinrich Kummerow on vacation with Ingeborg
- Born: 27 February 1903; Magdeburg
- Died: 4 February 1944 (aged 40); Halle
- Education: Humboldt University,Technical University
- Spouse: Ingeborg Kummerow (from 1936)
- Engineering career
- Discipline: Engineering
- Employer: Loewe-Radio-AG

Hansheinrich Kummerow (also: Hans-Heinrich Kummerow, 27 February 1903 in Magdeburg; 4 February 1944 in Halle) was a scientist and technician, doctor of engineering and resistance fighter against Nazism.

== Life ==
Kummerow was born in Magdeburg. His father was Heinrich Kummerow, a Privy Councillor and professor and department head at the Provincial School Board. His mother was Adele Kummerow, née Lejeune. After attending school in Magdeburg and Posen, he graduated from the Steglitz Gymnasium in Berlin in 1921. From the summer semester of 1921, he first studied music for three semesters. In 16 October 1922, he matriculated at the Faculty of Philosophy at the Humboldt University in Berlin and studied mathematics for one semester, but then switched to the Technical University in Charlottenburg in 1923 to completed his studies in chemistry. He finally graduated as an engineer in 1927.

== Career ==
He was employed as a lecture assistant at the Institute for Physical Chemistry and Electrochemistry at the Technical University, where he received his doctorate in engineering on 13 July 1929 with a dissertation entitled "The Thermal Decomposition of Nitrogen Oxide" under Max Vollmer. Karl Andreas Hofmann was an additional examiner.

Initially, Kummerow worked as chief engineer at the Gasglühlicht-Auer-Gesellschaft until 27 October 1932, when he moved position to the development office of the Loewe-Radio-AG company in Berlin.

== Resistance ==
Although he was not tied to any political party, he joined the communist resistance after the Nazi's seizure of power and organized acts of sabotage against the German armaments industry with Hans Coppi and Erhard Tohmfor. As a scout, he obtained important scientific and technical information for the Soviet Union, France and Great Britain. After the attack on the Soviet Union on 22 June 1941, he joined the resistance group around Harro Schulze-Boysen and Arvid Harnack that was later known as a Red Orchestra ("Rote Kapelle") and used their intelligence network to pass on important information to the Red Army. Amongst the documents he passed, were details of the FX 1400 radio controlled bomb taken from a military research establishment in Nauen.

Kummerow is repeatedly wrongly associated with the Oslo Report, which was written by the physicist Hans Ferdinand Mayer, who was employed at Siemens at the time.

According to the Berliner Morgenpost, "the engineer Hans-Heinrich Kummerow planned an assassination attempt on the Nazi propaganda minister" Joseph Goebbels in 1942. Kummerow planned to place a mine under the bridge leading to Goebbels' property on the island of Schwanenwerder and to detonate it remotely.

== Arrest ==
Kummerow was arrested in 30 November 1942 and sentenced to death by the 3rd senate of the Reich Military Court on 18 December 1942. On 4 February 1944, he was beheaded with a guillotine in Halle. The death register lists the cause of death as sudden cardiac death and respiratory arrest.

His wife Ingeborg Kummerow, whom he had married on 24 October 1936, was sentenced to death by the Reich Military Court in January 1943 and beheaded in Plötzensee Prison on 5 August 1943.
