= Ina Ender =

German resistance fighter

Ina Ender Ina Ender
- A photograph of Ender modelling, that was taken by photojournalist Hanns Hubmann around 1941.
- Born: Ina Schreier; 9 July 1917; Kreuzberg
- Died: 27 March 2008 (aged 90); Lehnitz, Germany
- Occupations: Seamstress, model, Police officer
- Organization: Red Orchestra
- Known for: Informing on high-ranking Nazi wives
- Parents: Erich Schreyer (father); Margarete Hätzel (mother)

Ina Ender (9 July 1917 – 27 March 2008) was a German resistance fighter, seamstress, fashion model and one of the first German criminal police officers.

== Life ==
Ender was the daughter of the trained sculptor and communist Erich Schreier and seamstress Margarete Hätzel. Her father was a co-founder of the Spartacus League and the Communist Party of Germany. He worked as a clerk in the Berlin-Kreuzberg district office and was chairman of the works council there until 1933. He became a well-known opponent of the Nazis.

From 1923 to 1927, Ina Schreier attended Kreuzberg elementary school and then the Minna-Cauer School in Neukölln for her secondary education. She became involved in the student council early on and came into contact with the Young Communists in 1931 through a family friend. Ender was the first girl to attend the Scharfenberg reform school. Through her friendship with Hans Lautenschläger and Hans Coppi, she joined the already illegal Communist Youth League in 1932 at the age of 15 and took part in her friends' political actions against the Nazi regime.

When Hitler seized power on 30 January 1933, her father was dismissed from the district office and abused by the Sturmabteilung during subsequent house searches. Despite her very good academic performance, Ender was subsequently deprived of her free place at boarding school. As her parents were unable to pay the school fees, she had to leave school without graduating and was unable to get an apprenticeship due to a lack of training places. Her mother then trained her as a seamstress and she managed to find a place at a vocational school for seamstresses. However, her training was not recognized as her mother was not authorized to train apprentices. Mother and daughter were initially able to scrape a living together from private commissions. By 1935, Ender was employed as a pieceworker in a yarn-making factory. In 1936, she found a job as a ready-to-wear seamstress in a ladies' tailoring shop. On the 14 September 1936, she married Hans Lautenschläger who was active in the resistance.

== Career ==
In 1936, the photojournalist with the Berliner Illustrirte Zeitung and photographer to the stars Hanns Hubmann, became aware of Ender and took her photograph, which appeared in the front page of the newspaper. Hubmann considered that Ender had all the prerequisites for a career as a photo model. In the following year, Ender was subsequently "discovered" by the fashion world and had begun working as a model (known in the parlance as a demonstration lady) for several fashion salons, the Metropol-Theater and the film company UFA. Ender worked in Berlin but demand for her skills led to work in other European countries.

== Resistance ==
In 1937 Hans Coppi, her school friend from Scharfenberg introduced Harro Schulze-Boysen to Ender in a coffee shop on Leipziger Strasse. Schulze-Boysen was the leader of a large resistance network in Berlin and he suggested that Ender should apply to work at the Berlin based couturer Annemarie Heise. The salon was considered a fashionable address for certain female screen stars like Marika Rökk and Zarah Leander and women from the National Socialist leadership like Eva Braun Hitler's girlfriend and others Magda Goebbels, Emmy Göring and Elisabeth Henckel von Ribbentrop. By early 1939, Ender was working as a model in the Heise salon and this enabled her to gather intelligence from the ladies that could be used by the resistance. The sophisticated atmosphere of the salon combined with the expert help provided by models like Ender along with the free flow of liqueur made the celebrity customers talkative. This enabled Ender to find out state secrets, appointments, travel dates as well as see changes in the power structures of the posh ladies of the ruling elite and odd tidbits of gossip that could be useful.

Every week Ender would meet with Hans Coppi to pass on any important information.

== Arrest ==
In September 1942, Ina Ender was arrested by the Gestapo and she along with Hilde Coppi, Hanni Weißensteiner and Erika Countess von Brockdorff were taken to Gestapo headquarters in Alexanderplatz. Ender was fortuitous as Lotte Pinzke had removed most of the incriminating evidence from the boathouse in Gaabs before the Gestapo arrived and dumped it in the Havel.

Between 30 June and 3 July 1943, Lautenschläger was tried for sedition, before the 2nd Senate of the Reichskriegsgericht. The prosecutor requested the death penalty but she was instead sentenced to 6 years in prison for assistance in the decomposition of military forces (Wehrkraftzersetzung) i.e distributing leaflets. Ender served her sentenced in Freiburg Prison and was released in 7 May 1945. Ender was fortuitous as Lotte Pinzke had removed most of the incriminating evidence from the boathouse in Gaabs and dumped it in the Havel.

== After World War II ==
After her liberation from prison, she was immediately appointed deputy mayor in Brand-Erbisdorf in May 1945 and worked there until the summer of 1946. After her mother and son Axel were resettled from Poland, she wanted to return to Berlin. However, she was initially assigned to the newly founded branch of the People's Police to protect goods transports in Niedersedlitz near Dresden and moved there with her mother and son. In 1947, she was transferred to the Großenhain district police office. There she initially worked in the administration and a few months later as head of the office. In 1949, she moved to the criminal investigation department as chief inspector of the state authority of the People's Police in Dresden. She was responsible for investigating sabotage activities and Nazi crimes. In May 1950, at her own request, she was transferred to Berlin to the main administration of the People's Police in the area of industrial security. Dismissed in October 1950 for violating official regulations, she had to look for a new job. She was appointed as manager of the Handelsorganisation (HO) in the industrial goods division and became head of department in 1953. When her husband Hans Lautenschläger returned home from Soviet captivity, they decided to separated amicably.

== Marriage ==
In December 1952, she married civil servant Siegfried Ender, who worked in price controls at the Ministry of Trade and Supply. In June 1953, the couples son Dieter was born. Ender took over the management of several expropriated companies. Shortly afterwards, in the course of the workers' uprising, she was the victim of unfounded accusations by the Berlin magistrate's department, who relieved of her duties and expelled from the SED in December 1954. As a result of her expulsion from the party, she was unable to find qualified work and had to accept an underpaid job, as a seamstress months later, in May 1955. She was readmitted to the SED in 1957 and became a member of the main department of the Berlin trade organization in 1962. From 1965 to 1967, she was head of the department for study affairs at the Technical College for Foreign Trade. She had to retire from work in 1967 for health reasons and became disabled in 1968. When her husband worked in Iraq from 1972 to 1975 as a scientific advisor to the President of the Trade Organization, she accompanied him there and was active in the field of financial policy. Back in the GDR, she spent the following years working with young people and preserving traditions, gave lectures on the anti-fascist resistance struggle and became involved in the PDS in her home town of Lehnitz after the fall of the SED dictatorship in the GDR.

== Awards and honours ==
In 20 February 1970, Ender was awarded the GDR's Medal Brotherhood in Arms in Gold in a presentation held by Erich Mielke.

== See also ==
- Oda Schottmüller
- Red Orchestra
- People of the Red Orchestra
