= Carl Johann Christian Zimmermann =

German architect (1831–1911)

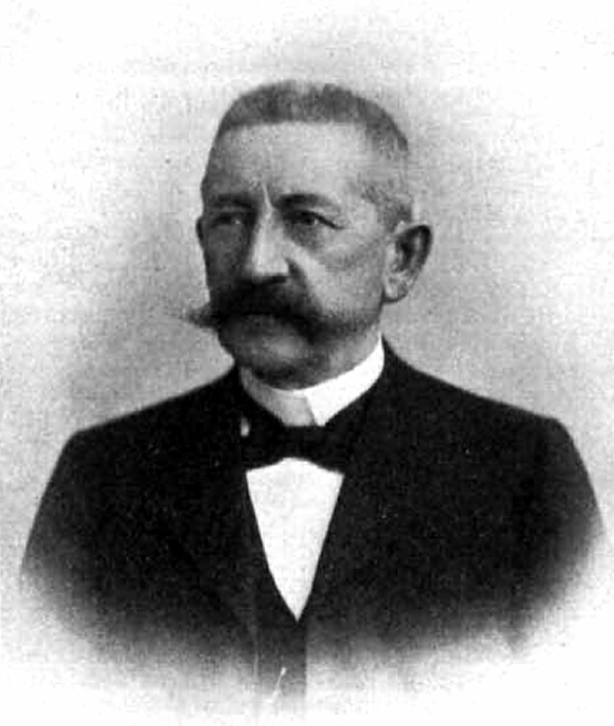
Carl Johann Christian Zimmermann (c.1880)

Carl Johann Christian Zimmermann, also known as Hans Zimmermann (8 November 1831, Elbing – 18 March 1911, Hamburg) was a German architect and construction manager.

== Biography ==
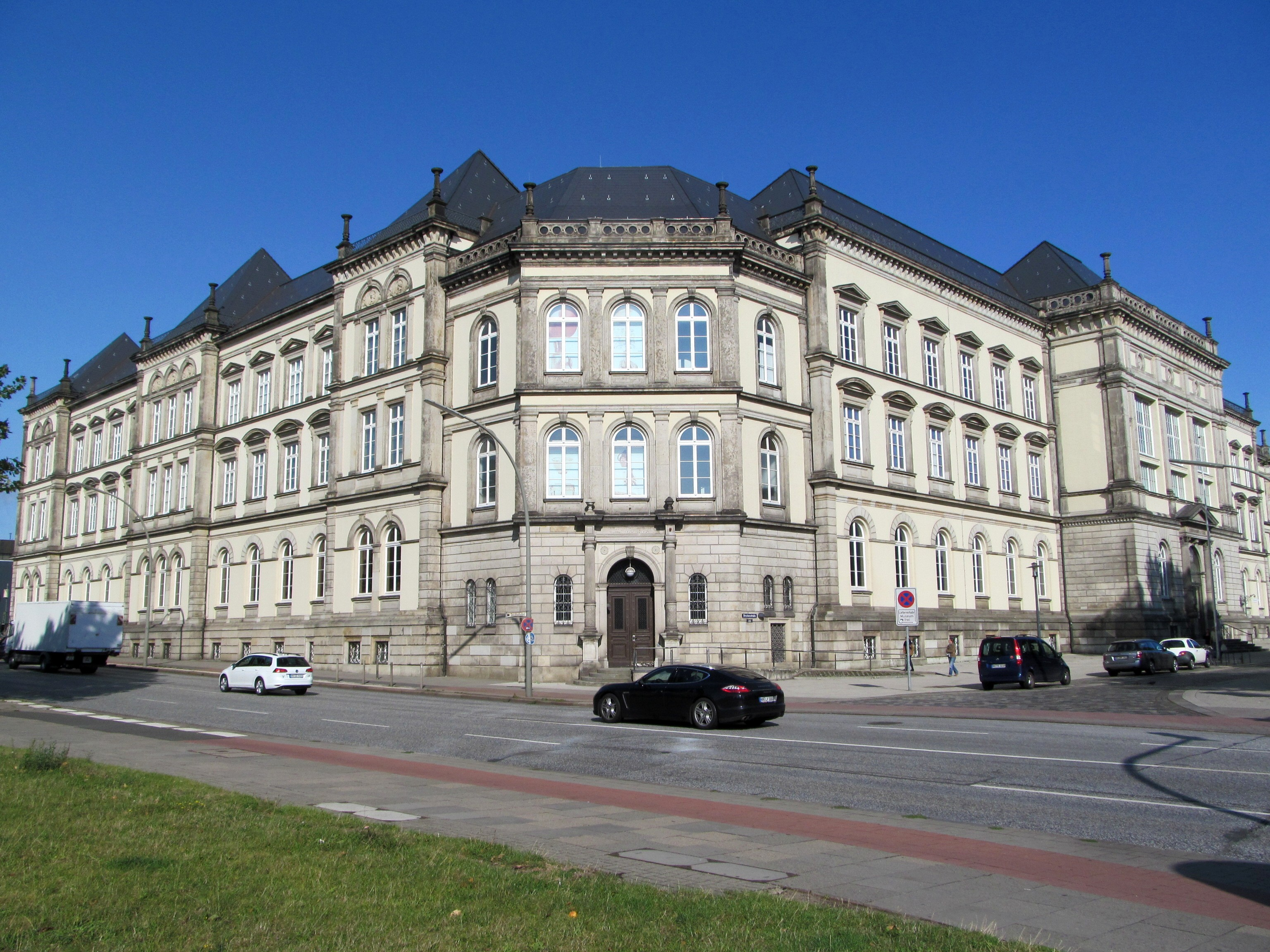
Museum für Kunst und Gewerbe

His father was a construction manager who briefly served as the mayor of Elbing. He initially studied art history at the University of Königsberg, passed the surveyor's examination and was involved in building a section of the Prussian Eastern Railway. From 1854 to 1856, he studied at the Bauakademie in Berlin and passed the construction manager examination. He was awarded the Schinkelpreis for engineering twice; in 1860 and 1861.

After 1862, he worked for the Building and Planning Commission, where his first assignment was designing the Barnimstrasse women's prison. In 1864, he moved to Breslau, where he had been elected head of the Building Department; responsible for building construction, town planning, and pipeline networks. He resigned that office in 1872.

From 1872 to 1908, he was in charge of urban development and the environment in Hamburg. His projects during that time included the Museum für Kunst und Gewerbe (1873–76), the Fuhlsbüttel Central Prison, the Wilhelm-Gymnasium (1883–85), and the University Medical Center Hamburg-Eppendorf (1884–89), among others. He also assisted Franz Andreas Meyer in planning the Speicherstadt at Hamburg harbor. He resigned at the age of seventy-seven. He had already transferred most of his major responsibilities to Albert Erbe. Fritz Schumacher was chosen to be his successor.

He died at the age of eighty, was cremated, and interred at the Friedhof Ohlsdorf. His grave has not been preserved.

In 2005–06, the Museum of Architecture, Wrocław (Breslau) held an exhibition of his plans and drawings called "Architect in Service of the City".
