= Oda Schottmüller =

German resistance fighter (1905–1943)

- Portrait of Oda Schottmüller 1928
- Born: 9 February 1905; Posen, German Empire
- Died: 5 August 1943 (aged 38); Plötzensee Prison, Berlin, Nazi Germany
- Cause of death: Execution by guillotine
- Education: Odenwald school, Berlin School of Modern Artistic Dance
- Occupations: Expressive dancer, sculptor and mask maker

Oda Schottmüller (9 February 1905 – 5 August 1943) was an expressive dancer, mask maker and sculptor. Schottmüller was most notable as a resistance fighter against the Nazis, through her association with a Berlin-based anti-fascist resistance group that she met through the sculptor Kurt Schumacher. The group would later be named by the Gestapo as Die Rote Kapelle (English: "the Red Orchestra").

Author and researcher Geertje Andresen conducted an analysis of Schottmüller's estate, which resulted in the publication of a book on Schottmüller's life. Andresen's work describes a vindictive murder by the Nazi state of a German woman who was only tangentially linked to Die Rote Kapelle and whose association with the group constituted resistance.

== Life ==
Oda Schottmüller was the daughter of archivist Kurt Schottmüller and Dorothea Schottmüller (née Stenzler), the granddaughter of the historian Konrad Schottmüller, and the niece of art historian Frida Schottmüller.

In 1906, Kurt Schottmüller moved his family to Danzig to work in the state archives. A year later, Dorothea suffered a severe nervous ailment and spent a substantial amount of time in a sanatorium during her recovery. She remained in the sanatorium until 1912, and upon leaving, returned to her parental home in Berlin instead of her own home in Gdańsk. With an absentee mother, Oda was left to be raised in Gdańsk by her father, whose income was limited as he was paying his wife maintenance. In August 1919, when Oda was fourteen years old, Kurt died. Oda's aunt—professor Frida Schottmüller, who was a custodian at the Kaiser-Friedrich Museum and a specialist in quattrocento sculptor—became Oda's legal guardian and the two resided in Berlin. Oda lived with her aunt until 1922.

Perhaps due to the war and her unstable family life, Oda was considered unstable and had a laissez-faire attitude to life and work. Frida realised that spending any more time in the state school would have been a waste of time, so she asked Gerda Schottmüller—another of Oda's aunts who worked at the Odenwald school in Heppenheim—to arrange an interview between Headmaster Paul Geheeb and herself to determine if Oda could be admitted to that school. From 1922 to 1924 Oda attended Odenwald to prepare for her Abitur, and became lifelong friends with Klaus Mann who later became a well-known writer. Geheeb considered Schottmüller to be unstable during the whole period she attended Odenwald School, but she managed to pass her Abitur in 1924.

Between 1924 and 1927 Schottmüller completed an arts and crafts education in goldsmithing, pottery and enamel in Pforzheim and Frankfurt. Her family would not support her dream to be a sculptor and dancer, something she had practised at the Odenwald School. In 1928, when she became of legal age to decide her own future, she studied dance at the Berlin School of Modern Artistic Dance with German dance teacher and choreographer Vera Skoronel and Swiss dance teacher Berthe Trümpy. At the dance studio she met Fritz Cremer, the sculptor who acted as occasional headmaster for the school and later became part of the collegial discussion group that was led by Harro Schulze-Boysen.

At the same time she also studied sculpture with Milly Steger at the Association of Berlin Artists.

== Career ==
Oda Schottmüller masked in the alraune dance performance with the Mandrake mask, circa 1941

In 1931, after passing the physical fitness examination that consisted of physical education and gymnastics, she joined the Volksbühne theatre as a dancer. At the same time, she had a sculpture studio in Berlin that was in the same building as Johannes Itten's studio. In the early 1930s, she designed costumes and wooden masks in the studio to incorporate into her performances.

On 30 January 1933, Adolf Hitler became Chancellor of Germany and the fascists rose to power. From September 1933, all dancers in Germany were informed that they were required to register with the Reich Chamber of Culture. From that point onward, the type of expressive and experimental dance that Schottmüller performed in the Weimar Republic was prohibited. Schottmüller chose to not register and never caught the Ministry's attention.

Her first solo dance performance was organised in March 1934 at the theatre at Kurfürstendamm. Her style of dance was eccentric: it reflected the expressionist dance or Ausdruckstanz of the 1920s and combined masks and costumes to suit the mood and transform into mythological creatures. The names of the performances reflected the eccentric nature of the performances, such as Wizard, The Hanged, Strange Hour, and Witch. Throughout the interwar period of the 1930s, Schottmüller received favourable press reviews for her dance and sculptures. Her sculpture, Dancer, was reproduced in the Deutsche Allgemeine Zeitung. In 1940 a reviewer called Nohara wrote highly of Schottmüller. A few weeks before her arrest in 1940, a full page spread about Schottmüller's work appeared in the Die junge Dame (English: "The Young Lady") magazine that praised Schottmüller and noted she had gone on an Army tour to encourage the troops.

In 1935, Schottmüller rented a studio on Charlottenburg's Reichsstrasse 106. During this time her dances continued to evolve: instead of mythological creatures she changed to figures, and her dance's underlying structure and themes changed as well. The nomenclature of her dance names also changed to titles like Erring Soul Angel of Outrage or Tragedy. They reflected how she felt about the social and political reality that she found herself in as the Nazi state evolved. In August 1936 she participated in her first group performance as a dancer in the 1936 Summer Olympics as part of the accompanying program of the Olympic Games. She danced in the movement choir for a performance of Heracles, which won a competition that looked for a performance, song or composition fit for the Olympics. The performance was conducted by the Berlin Philharmonic in the 20000-seater open-air Dietrich Eckart theatre, now called the Waldbühne. She was paid for this performance which gave some National Socialist respectability.

In October 1937, the Reich Chamber of Culture finally located Schottmüller and she was forced to complete an application and a course in German dance. She refused, and instead sent in reviews of her work to the Ministry which they seemed to accept. In February 1938 she was offered an opportunity to dance in the Volksbühne theatre in the Hour of the Dance, which was a performance to showcase young and new dancers performing the German Dance. To satisfy the Nazis she renamed her masks the German Suite and performance dances with names like e.g. Angel of Consolation and The Stranger.

In the autumn of 1938, Schottmüller met the German composer Kurt Schwaen. Schwaen worked with Schottmüller to develop new dances to which he composed new music.

On 11 November 1941 Schottmüller gave her last public performance—The Last— in a prestigious concert hall, Beethovensaal on Köthener Straße, which was formerly used by the Berlin Philharmonic orchestra until it was destroyed by British bombers on 30 January 1944. Reviews stated it was an "incarnation of plastic ideas, to which she visually transforms her own physicality". On 6 December 1941, she spent three months on tour in the Netherlands and France for the Wehrmacht and for the rest of 1942 she continued to tour before being arrested and murdered.

== Resistance ==
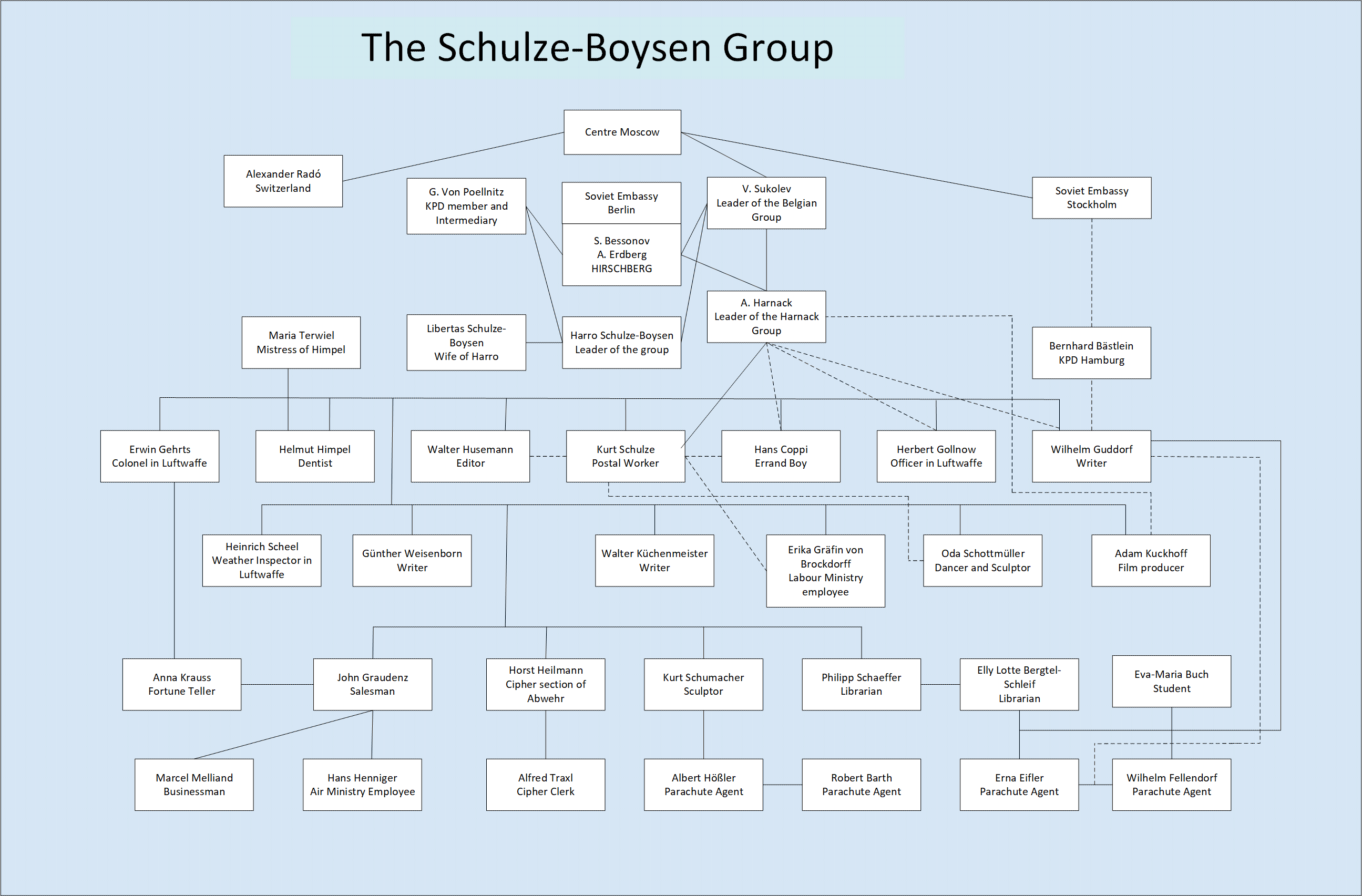
The Schulze-Boysen group in Germany

In 1935 Schottmüller met the sculptor Kurt Schumacher in the studio of Fritz Cremer. She initiated a love affair with Schumacher, unaware that he was married. They shared a common bond that led to friendship driven in their opposition to National Socialism and their common interest in sculptural design.

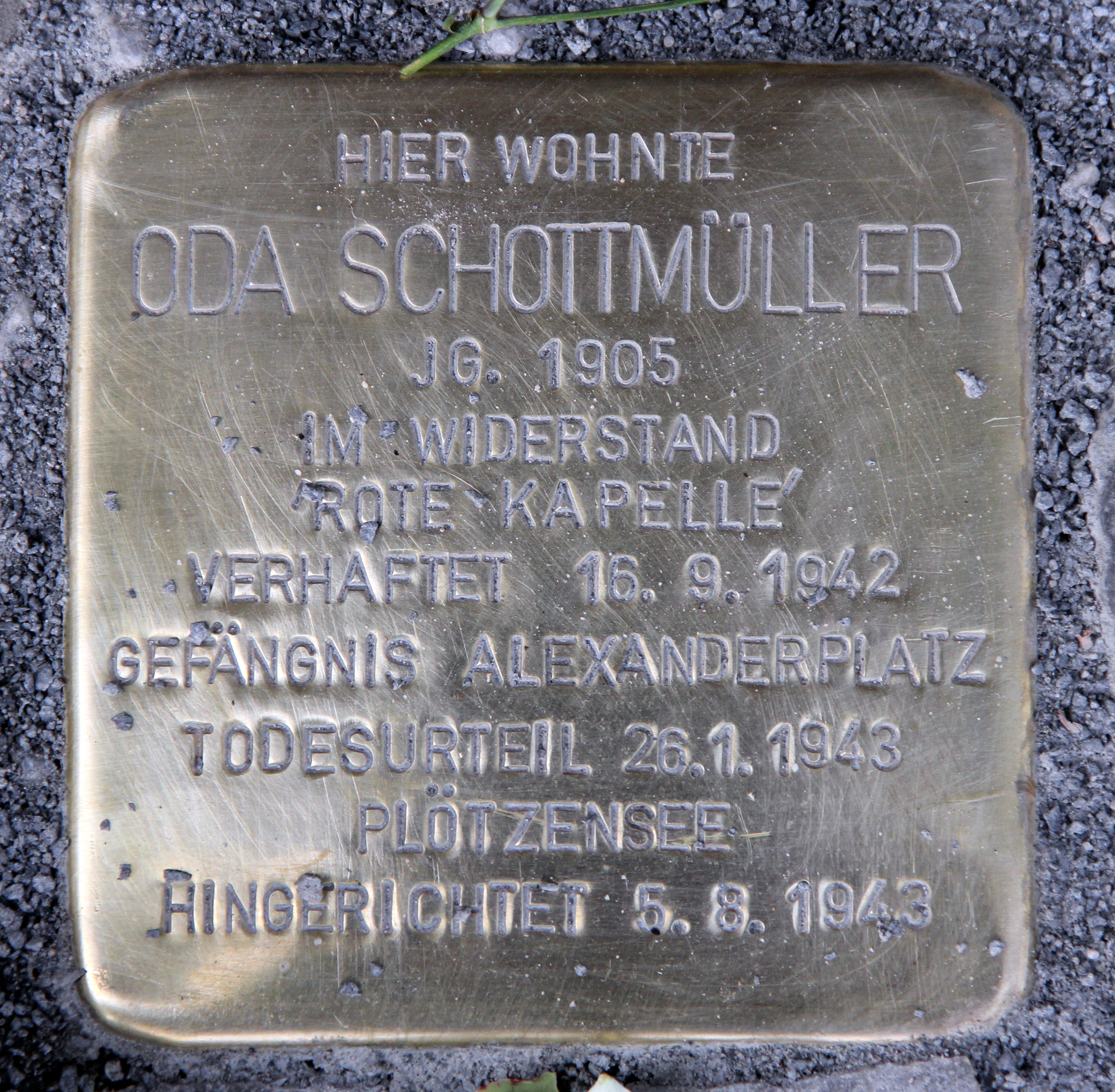
A Stolperstein or stumbling block memorial to Oda Schottmüller that is located at Reichsstraße 106, Berlin-Westend, Germany

== Arrest ==
On 16 September 1942, Schottmüller was arrested at her studio and sent to a holding cell in the prison on Alexanderplatz. She was accused of using her studio to host a radio set, which she denied. In January 1943, she was sentenced to death by the Reichskriegsgericht "for aiding and abetting the preparation of a treasonable enterprise and enemy favouritism". Due to the number of executions that were being conducted, Schottmüller had to spend two months in solitary confinement. In March 1943 Schottmüller was sent to Plötzensee Prison for six weeks before being sent to the Barnimstrasse women's prison. While in the women's prison she petitioned Hitler for a pardon which was rejected on 21 July 1943. On 5 August 1943, she was executed by guillotine in Plötzensee Prison.

== Archives ==
The police records of Schottmüller's arrest did not survive; the only surviving materials are the letters that she sent from prison. It is doubtful that she was honest in her writing, as she confessed that she did not know half the people that the Gestapo had said she knew, nor the fact that some of them were Communists. In a letter to her father she states: "I was so glad of my stupidity + cluelessness about political things ... I'm entirely unaware of these things."

== Awards and honours ==
On 23 September 2016, a Stolperstein for Schottmüller was laid in front of the 106 Reichsstraße in Charlottenburg. On 25 August 2019, a memorial stone was unveiled on St. Matthew's Cemetery in Schöneberg in Berlin.

=== Odonymy ===
In November 2014, the Schottmüllerstraße in Eppendorf was renamed after Schottmüller. The street was formerly named after the bacteriologist Hugo Schottmüller but the aristocratic Pallandt family intervened to rename it in honour of her.

=== Tributes and exhibitions ===
The first tribute to Schottmüller was in 1946 by German theatre critic Paul Fechter who reported on the first art exhibition after the war that spoke about Schottmüller and Schumacher. There have been many more.

Geertje Andresen, formerly a research associate at the Memorial to the German Resistance, collaborated with Deutsches Tanzarchiv Köln in Cologne to conduct an analysis of the estate of Schottmüller. It resulted in the publication of a book and an exhibition that was created in cooperation with Hans Coppi; the latter was held on 16 November 2006 at the German Resistance Memorial Center.

== See also ==
- Ina Ender
