= Charlotte Eisenblätter =

German anti-Nazi activist (1903–1944)

- Eisenblätter
- Born: 7 August 1903; Berlin, German Empire
- Died: 25 August 1944 (aged 41); Plötzensee Prison; Berlin, Nazi Germany
- Cause of death: Execution
- Monuments: A Stolperstein near her place of death
- Occupations: Resistance member, secretary
- Known for: Member of Communist Party of Germany resistance group

Charlotte Eisenblätter (7 August 1903 – 25 August 1944) was a German anti-Nazi activist and freedom fighter.

== Biography ==
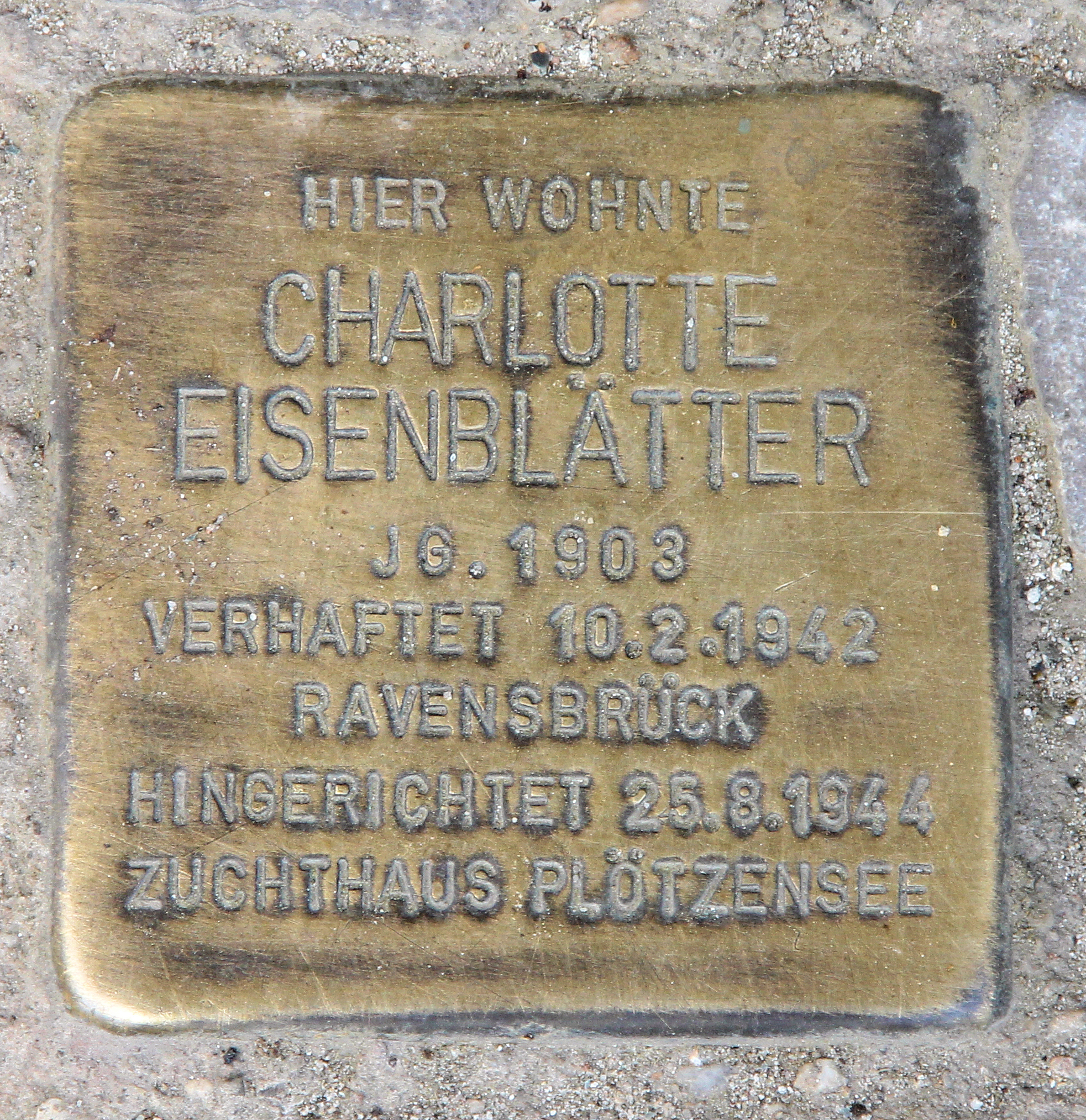
Stone at 99 Goebelstrasse, in Charlottenburg-Nord

Eisenblätter was born at Galvanistraße in Berlin. Youngest of eight, from a working-class family she worked as a clerk and secretary. When she was fifteen she joined the Friends of Nature organization. Eisenblätter got the opportunity to hike on weekends. Aware of the implications of poverty Eisenblätter made many friends in the Communist Party of Germany (KPD) which was eliminated when the National Socialist Party took power in 1933.

During the Nazi era Eisenblätter got involved in the anti-Nazi communist resistance group associated with Robert Uhrig, Beppo Römer and John Sieg. She was responsible for disseminating the anti-regime leaflets, creating copies during a time that doing so was punishable by death. By 1939 she was a senior underground activist. By the summer of 1941, Eisenblätter was in contact with the KPD foreign representative Charlotte Bischoff who passed her illegal and secret documentation that she used to produce the leaflets. In 1941 she provided room and board to the German Communist leader Alfred Kowalke. She was arrested in February 1942. Initially she was sent to the Ravensbrück concentration camp. She was there for two years before being indicted for high treason on 15 February 1944. During questioning Eisenblätter took full responsibility for the leaflets and is credited with saving the life of Martha Butte in doing so. Eisenblätter was sentenced on 10 July 1944. As expected, the sentence was death. It was carried out in Plötzensee prison on 25 August 1944. Before her death Eisenblätter wrote a moving letter asking people not to mourn but recognise that she was reconciled to die for the ideals she held. Her sister took her own life on receiving the news of her execution.

== Awards and honors ==
On 31 May 1951 a street, Eisenblätterstrasse was named after her in Niederschönhausen, Pankow, Berlin. Eisenblätter was remembered by a postage stamp issued by the German Democratic Republic on 3 September 1959. A memorial stone was laid in her name at Goebelstrasse on September 12, 2008. Friends of Nature opened a house in her name in Thuringia.
