= Else Imme =

German resistance fighter (1885–1943)

- Imme
- Born: 24 September 1885; Berlin, German Empire
- Died: 5 August 1943 (aged 57); Plötzensee Prison; Berlin, Nazi Germany
- Cause of death: Decapitation
- Occupations: Resistance member, sales manager
- Known for: Member of Rote Kapelle (Red Orchestra resistance group
- Movement: German Labour Front; National Socialist People's Welfare
- Mother: Elisabeth Bertha Imme

Else Josefine Imme (born 24 September 1885 in Berlin, 5 August 1943 in Plötzensee Prison) was a German resistance fighter. Imme was a member of the anti-fascist resistance group that was later called the Red Orchestra by the Abwehr, during the Nazi period.

== Life ==
Else was born in 1885 as an illegitimate daughter of the German tailor Elisabeth Bertha Imme. Her mother married the worker Rudolf Paul Neugebauer in 1895. She was the maternal half-sister of Martha Bernstein, an artist and committed communist, who emigrated to the Soviet Union in 1934 and became an employee of the Communist International (Comintern) administration. After attending school Imme took an apprenticeship as a retail saleswomen. She became the director of the Kunstgewerbe (arts and crafts) department in the Wertheim department store on Leipziger Platz.

In 1933, Imme joined the German Labour Front and the National Socialist People's Welfare, both of which were Nazi organisations. Although Imme wasn't politically active, she did support the communists.

== Resistance ==
From 1938 onwards, Imme was involved in a loosely organised Berlin resistance organisation associated with Harro Schulze-Boysen, that would later be called the Red Orchestra ("Rote Kapelle"). Imme took part in the anti-fascist resistance struggle by collecting money for fellow citizens who were persecuted by the National Socialists for racist reasons. She also regularly listened to the broadcasts of Radio Moscow and passed on this information. She would also use her apartment for illegal meetings.

In July 1942, Imme was visited in the department store by "Willi", a representative from her half-sister. In reality he was Wilhelm Fellendorf, a Soviet agent, known as a "Scout" who had parachuted into Germany with Erna Eifler from the Soviet Union on the night of 16–17 May 1942. The couple were on a mission to contact Ilse Stöbe, an important Soviet agent in Berlin who had lost contact with Soviet intelligence when the Soviet Union was invaded. The couple had been unable to find Stöbe and so stayed at Imme's apartment for several days before moving on.

== Arrest ==
On 18 October 1942, Imme was arrested by the Gestapo. After a short stay in the Gestapo prison on Prinz Albrecht Strasse, she was taken to the police prison on Alexanderplatz while awaiting trial. On 30 January 1943, the 2nd Senate of the German military court, the Reichskriegsgericht sentenced her to death for "favouring the enemy". She was then taken to death row in the Barnimstrasse women's prison. On 5 August 1943 at 7:30 p.m., she was executed in the yard of Plötzensee Prison.
