= Elli Voigt =

German resistance fighter (1912–1944)

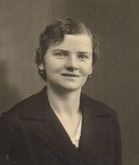
- Born: Elli Garius; 22 February 1912; Berlin, Germany
- Died: 8 December 1944 (aged 32); Berlin-Plötzensee, Germany
- Cause of death: Execution
- Occupation(s): Resistance fighter, domestic servant, factory worker

Elli Voigt (22 February 1912 – 8 December 1944) was a German resistance fighter during the Nazi era.

== Early life ==
Born into a working-class family in Berlin, Voigt joined in her youth the "Fichte" workers' sports association. She married Max Giese in 1930 and had a daughter with him, but they divorced in 1934. She then met communist Fritz Voigt, who was arrested in 1935 and spent several years in prison and Sachsenhausen concentration camp.

== Resistance activities ==
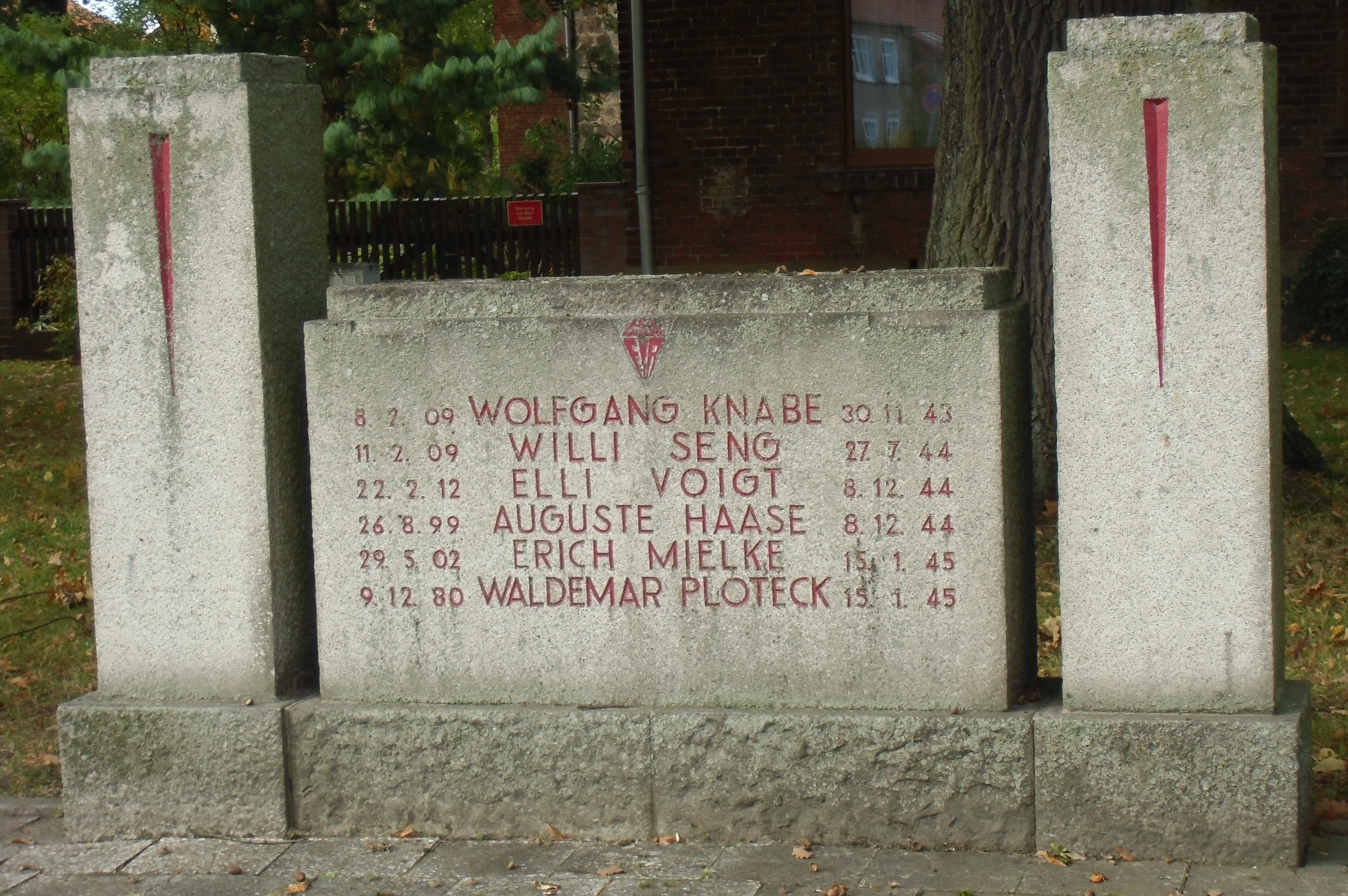
Memorial stone for murdered opponents of the Nazi regime in Schönow.

After Fritz Voigt's release in 1941, the couple moved to Schönow in Brandenburg. Elli Voigt became involved in illegal political activities, particularly after Fritz was drafted into a "probation unit" of the 999th Division in June 1943.

Working at the Schönow cable factory, Voigt established connections with the resistance group led by Franz Jacob and Anton Saefkow in the fall of 1943. She also formed links with resistance groups in Bernau and Zepernick. Some of Voigt's resistance activities included printing and distributing flyers, obtaining forged papers for persecuted individuals, and supporting forced laborers in nearby camps.

== Execution ==
On 13 June 1944, Elli Voigt was arrested. The "People's Court" sentenced her to death on 21 October 1944. She was executed in Berlin-Plötzensee on December 8, 1944, at the age of 32.

== See also ==
- Resistance during World War II
