= Johanna Kirchner =

German opponent of the Nazi regime (1889–1944)

- Kirchner
- Born: Johanna Stunz; 24 April 1889; Frankfurt, German Empire
- Died: 9 June 1944 (aged 55); Plötzensee Prison; Berlin, Nazi Germany
- Cause of death: Decapitation
- Monuments: Commemorative plaque at St. Paul's Church, Frankfurt am Main
- Occupation: Resistance member
- Known for: Member of the Social Democratic Party of Germany and a resistance member
- Political party: Social Democratic Party
- Children: 2

Johanna "Hanna" Kirchner (née Johanna Stunz; 24 April 1889 – 9 June 1944) was a German opponent of the Nazi régime.

== Life ==
Johanna Stunz came from a social-democratic family from Frankfurt, Hesse-Nassau. Her grandfather was one of Frankfurt's first social-democratic aldermen and her father, who was a master carpenter by trade, was also a committed social-democrat. At 14, she joined the Socialist Worker Youth, and at 18 became a member of the Social Democratic Party of Germany (Sozialdemokratische Partei Deutschlands – SPD). She worked avidly in the women's movement. In Frankfurt, she became friends with Eleonore Wolf, whose life was taking a similar path.

During the First World War, Kirchner, now a mother of two daughters, busied herself in communal welfare, dedicating herself to needy women's and children's welfare. After that, she worked in the Workers' Welfare organization (Arbeiterwohlfahrt; AWO), which she founded together with Marie Juchacz in 1919. Her special concern here was children who were underfed as a result of the war and the widespread inflation that struck Germany later. Many of these children suffered from damaged health and stunted growth. They had had their childhood taken away from them by events over which they had no control. Kirchner took many of these children to Switzerland for their health. During the Ruhrkampf, a brief civil war in Germany in 1920, Kirchner helped evacuate thousands of children from the Ruhr district, sending them to stay with families in Hesse.

In 1933, Adolf Hitler came to power, and the dedicated anti-fascist had to go underground, as her help in freeing an anti-Nazi from the Gestapo became known, leading to the danger of her possible arrest. She fled, without her family, to Saarbrücken, which was then still under League of Nations administration. There she worked at kitchen jobs and as a waitress, also caring for German émigrés through, among other means, the Persecuted Anti-Fascists' Aid Committee (German: für verfolgte Antifaschisten).

When the Second World War broke out in 1939, Kirchner fled to Forbach, Metz (both in Alsace-Lorraine, France), and then finally Paris. Even while abroad, she helped the resistance movement in Germany: she led the Saar Refugees' Committee (Saarflüchtlingskommitee), drew up plans and reports for the SPD's executive in exile, and produced and distributed illegal leaflets.

Even though Kirchner belonged to the SPD and Eleonore Wolf did illegal work for the Communist Party of Germany (KPD), they worked quite closely together in the Saar region as they organized the emigration of many officials of the workers' movement out of the Reich. (See: Rote Hilfe). From this they also published, under Wolfgang Abendroth's editorship "die Einheit der Arbeiterbewegung in der antifaschistischen Arbeit" (The Unity of the Workers' Movement in Anti-Fascist Work).

In 1942, Kirchner was arrested by the Vichy Régime and handed over to the Gestapo. She was sentenced to ten years' hard labour ("Zuchthaus") for treason, the first year of which she spent in a prison in Cottbus, which she shared with several female members of the Red Orchestra resistance group, whose goal was to hasten the Nazi régime's collapse. These women's solidarity greatly helped Kirchner overcome the ordeal of being thrown in prison. However, Kirchner's case was brought back before the Volksgerichtshof in 1944. This time, Roland Freisler, the Chief Justice at the Volksgerichtshof, sentenced her to death, and she was beheaded at Plötzensee Prison in Berlin. The judgment accused Kirchner of having "treasonably rooted herself in the evilest Marxist high-treason propaganda". It also accused her of "treasonably gathering cultural, economic, political, and military intelligence and communicating" the same.

"Keep Goethe's words in mind," wrote Kirchner in a letter to her children on the day of her death, "'Die and become'. Don't cry for me. I believe in a better future for you."

== Legacy ==
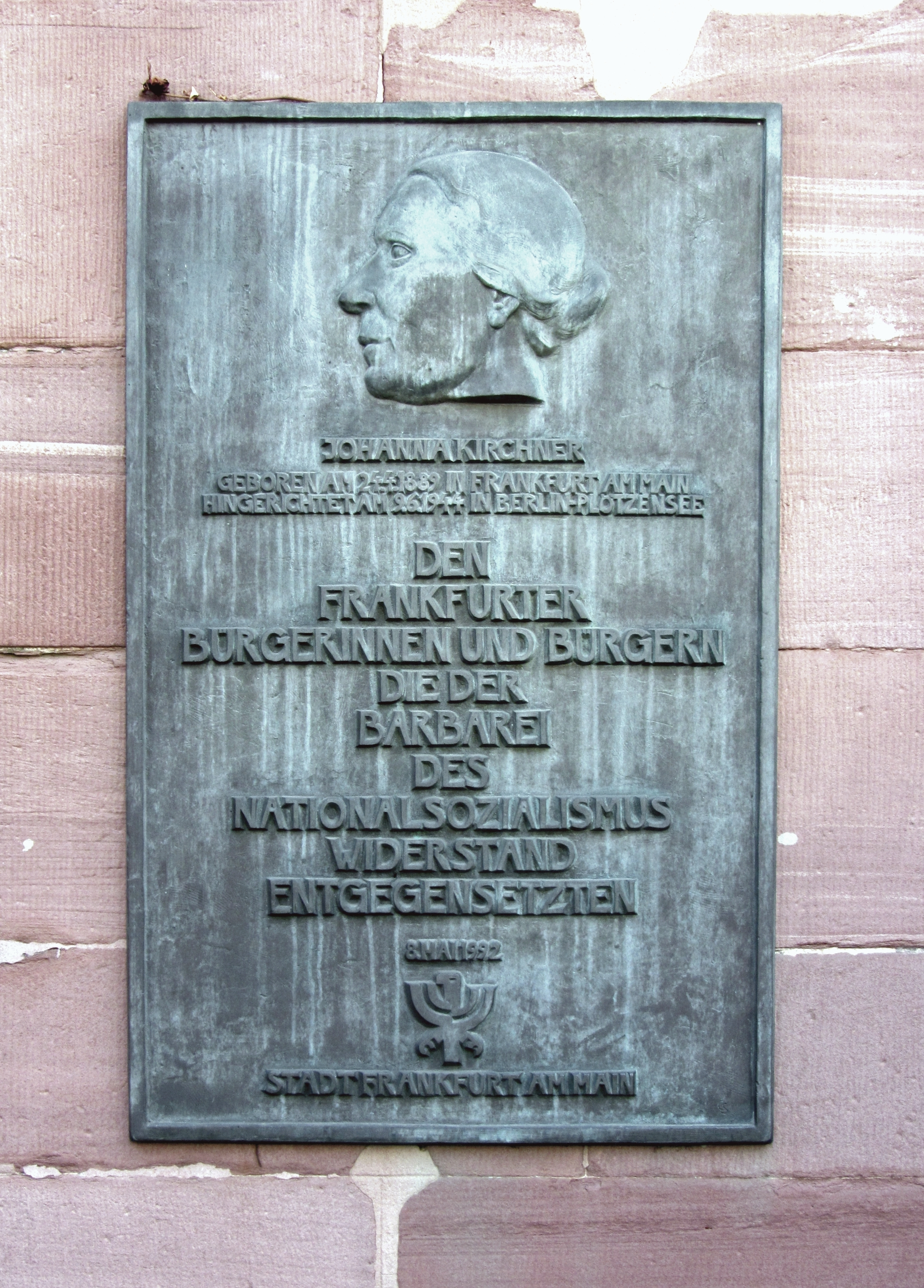
Commemorative plaque at St. Paul's Church, Frankfurt am Main

Since 1990, the city of Frankfurt am Main, Kirchner's birthplace, has yearly awarded the Johanna Kirchner Medal to those who fight against oppression, and stand up against terror, torture, and murder.

Her poem "Im Gefängnis" was set to music by Norbert Glanzberg (Holocaust Lieder).
