= Helene Gotthold =

Jehovah's Witness executed in Nazi Germany (1896–1944)

- Gotthold
- Born: Helene Nieswand Gotthold; 31 December 1896; Dortmund, German Empire
- Died: 8 December 1944 (aged 47); Plötzensee Prison; Berlin, Nazi Germany
- Cause of death: Decapitation
- Movement: Jehovah's Witness
- Spouse: Friedrich Gotthold
- Children: 2
- Parents: Theodor August Nieswand (father); Wilhelmina Geborene Britt (mother)

Helene Nieswand Gotthold (31 December 1896 – 8 December 1944) was a Jehovah's Witness who was guillotined by Nazi Germany at Plötzensee Prison.

Helene was the daughter of Theodor August Nieswand and Wilhelmina Geborene Britt, born in Dortmund, Germany on 31 December 1896. She married Friedrich Gotthold in the Lutheran Church in Herne, North Rhine-Westphalia. In 1923, their daughter Gisela (Tillmann) was born in Herne. Three years later, Helene and Friedrich converted to Jehovah's Witness. In 1931, their son Gerd was born in Buchom.

As part of their faith, Jehovah's Witnesses refuse to swear allegiance to or join political entities. Their unwillingness to join the Nazi party and Hitler Youth, fly Nazi flags, or give the Nazi salute, they were particular targets for Nazi persecution. On 1 April 1935, the Reich outlawed the Watch Tower Bible and Tract Society. In 1936, Friedrich was arrested. Following a search of their home (which still stands on Düngelstraße in Herne) in 1937, Helene was also arrested. While incarcerated, she was beaten, tried, convicted, and sentenced to eight months imprisonment.

In February 1944, Helene and Friedrich were again arrested and imprisoned in Essen. After Allied bombings there on the night of 26–27 April by 493 bombers, Helene was transferred to Potsdam on 6 May 1944. From there she was transferred to Berlin on 4 August.

Helene was charged with giving asylum to men who refused to fight for the Nazis and for holding illegal meetings for her faith. She was held at Plötzensee Prison. Helene was allowed to write a letter to her family before her execution. She was executed by guillotine on Friday, 8 December 1944, at 11:48 am.
