= Eva-Maria Buch =

German resistance fighter (1921–1943)

- Born: 31 January 1921; Berlin, Weimar Republic
- Died: 5 August 1943 (aged 22); Plötzensee Prison, Berlin, Nazi Germany
- Cause of death: Execution by guillotine
- Citizenship: German
- Occupation: student
- Movement: Member of the Red Orchestra ("Rote Kapelle")

Eva-Maria Buch (31 January 1921 – 5 August 1943) was a resistance fighter against the Nazi régime in Germany associated with the Red Orchestra (Rote Kapelle) resistance group.

== Life ==
Buch was born and lived with her parents in Charlottenburg, a borough of Berlin, until the mid-1930s. She was sent to the Ursuline School run by Catholic nuns until it was shut down in 1939. Without an Abitur, she attended a seminar for interpreters at the University of Berlin. While working at a bookshop during 1941 and 1942, Buch became acquainted with Wilhelm Guddorf, through whom she became involved with the Red Orchestra. In autumn 1942, Buch attempted to hide Guddorf from a wave of Red Orchestra arrests, but she was arrested by the Gestapo on 11 October. Guddorf was arrested and sentenced to death soon thereafter. She was executed the following year, on 13 May 1943.

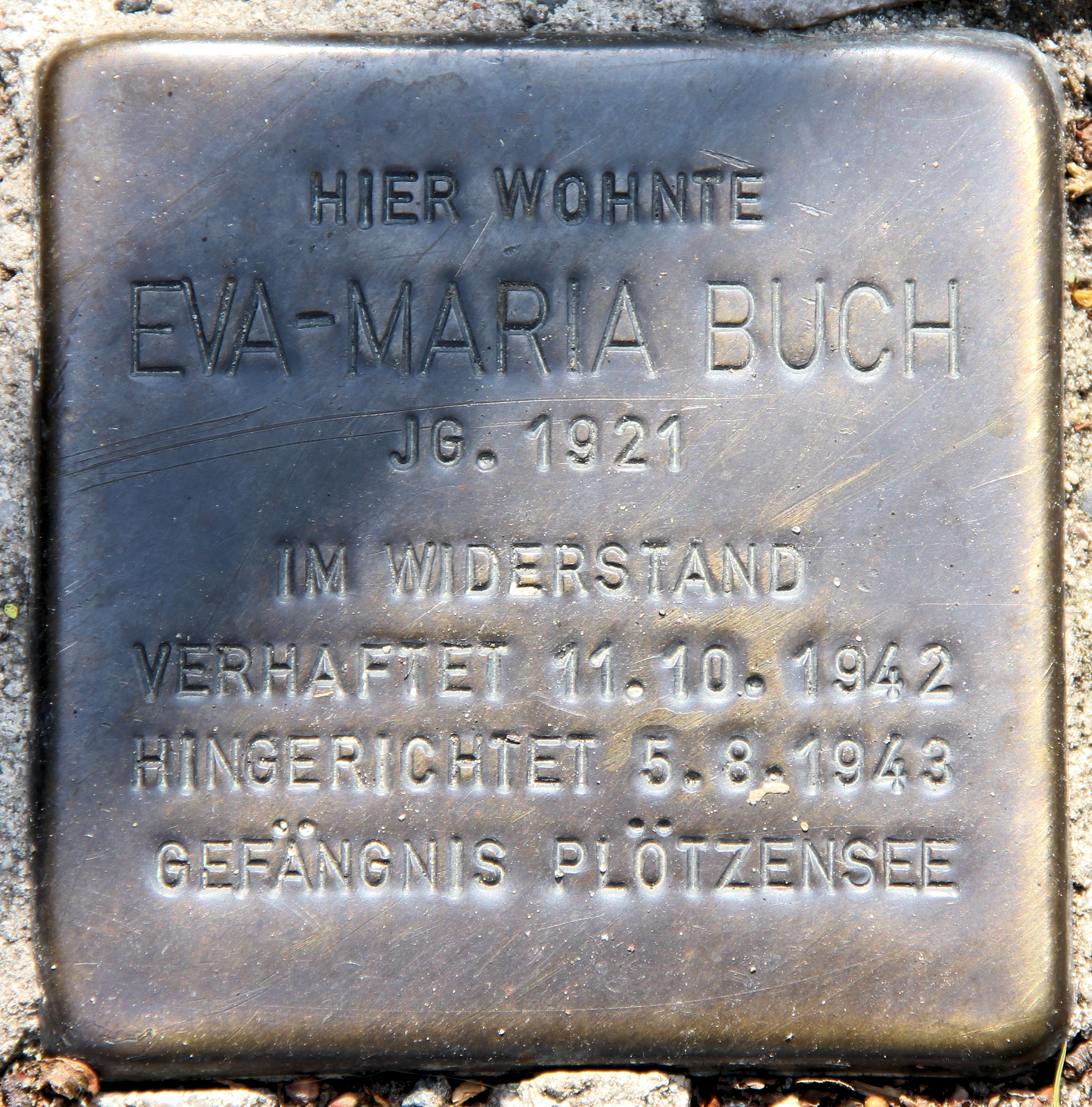

Buch was charged and her case heard at the Reichskriegsgericht (Reich Military Tribunal) between February 1–3, 1943. The primary evidence given against her was an article meant for slave labourers working in munition factories that she had translated into French. To protect others, Buch claimed she had composed the article herself. As a consequence, she was found guilty and sentenced to death. Her parents appealed to Adolf Hitler for clemency, but he personally refused their request. Buch was guillotined at Plötzensee Prison, Berlin, on 5 August 1943. She was 22 years old.

The Catholic Church in Germany included Eva-Maria Buch in the martyrology of the 20th century.

== Memorials ==
Eva-Maria Buch is remembered in Berlin by a memorial stone at Unter den Linden 6 and a plaque near St. Hedwig's Cathedral. Since 1993, the Tempelhof City Library has borne the name Eva-Maria-Buch-Bibliothek.

== Bibliography ==
- Schilde, Kurt (1992). Eva-Maria Buch und die "Rote Kapelle". Erinnerung an den Widerstand gegen den Nationalsozialismus. Mit einem Geleitwort von Hanna-Renate Laurien. Berlin
- Schilde, Kurt (1994). Eva-Maria Buch – Biographische Skizze eines kurzen Lebens. In: Hans Coppi / Jürgen Danyel / Johannes Tuchel (Hrsg.): Die Rote Kapelle im Widerstand gegen den Nationalsozialismus. Berlin, p. 204ff.
