= Rose Schlösinger =

German resistance fighter (1907–1943)

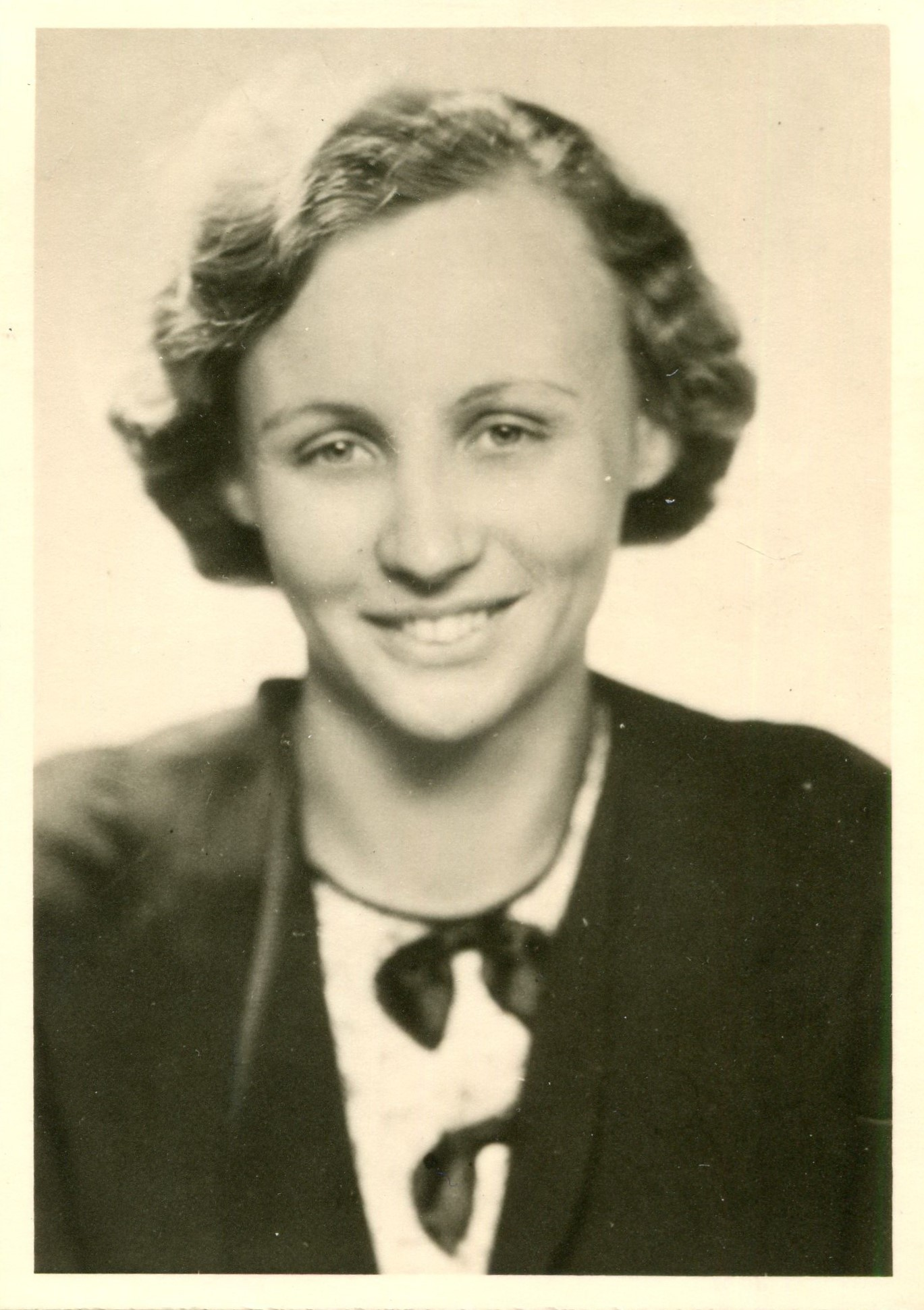
- Schlösinger, 1939
- Born: 5 October 1907; Frankfurt, German Empire
- Died: 5 August 1943 (aged 35); Plötzensee Prison; Berlin, Nazi Germany
- Cause of death: Decapitation
- Monuments: A Stolperstein near her place of death
- Occupations: Resistance member, secretary
- Known for: Messenger for Rote Kapelle (Red Orchestra resistance group
- Political party: Social Democratic Party
- Spouse(s): Friedrich Heinemann (m. 1932; div. 1935) Bodo Schlösinger (m. 1936; died 1943)
- Children: 1
- Mother: Sophie Ennenbach
- Awards: Order of the Red Star, 1969

Rose Schlösinger (5 October 1907 – 5 August 1943) was a German social worker and resistance fighter against the Nazi regime. She was associated with the Red Orchestra (Rote Kapelle) resistance group and passed along encrypted messages from Arvid Harnack. She was arrested in October 1942, sentenced to death by the Reich War Tribunal, and executed in August 1943.

== Early life and family ==
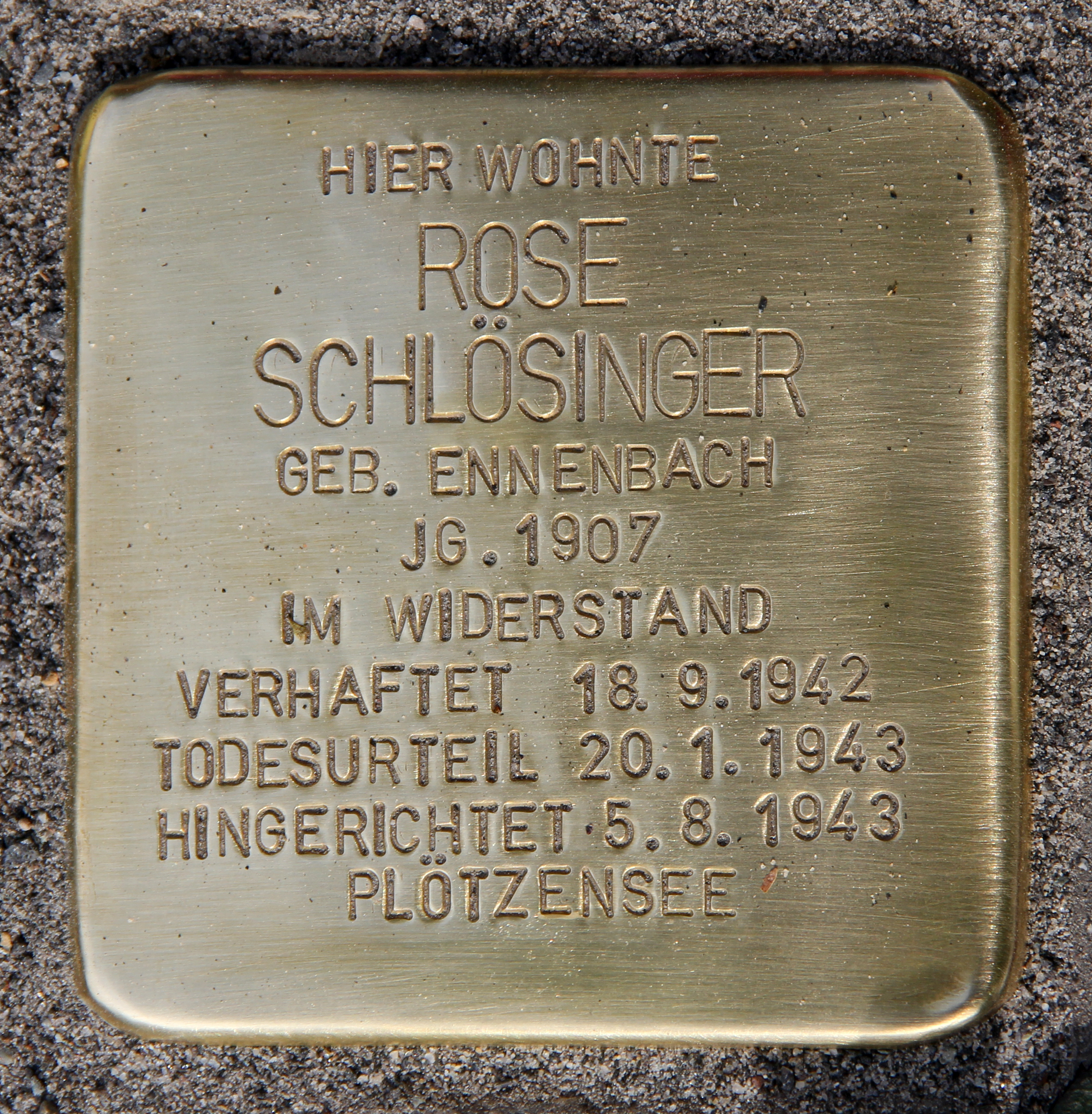
A Stolperstein bearing Schlösinger's name

Rose Ennenbach was born in Frankfurt am Main on 5 October 1907 to a working-class family. She was raised by a single mother, Sophie Ennenbach, who had some prominence as a member of the Social Democratic Party. Rose was active with the Socialist Workers Youth Party (Sozialistischen Arbeiterjugend) and studied to be a kindergarten teacher, training in childcare and job counseling at the Frankfurt Welfare School. She married Friedrich Heinemann and in January 1932 gave birth to their daughter, Marianne. They divorced soon afterwards and Rose returned to live with her mother. She interned with a social station after passing her exams, but was unable to gain employment as a social worker after the Nazi Party rose to power in 1933. She then learned shorthand and secured a job as a typist at the Wanderer Continental Typewriter Works in Chemnitz.

== Resistance during World War II ==
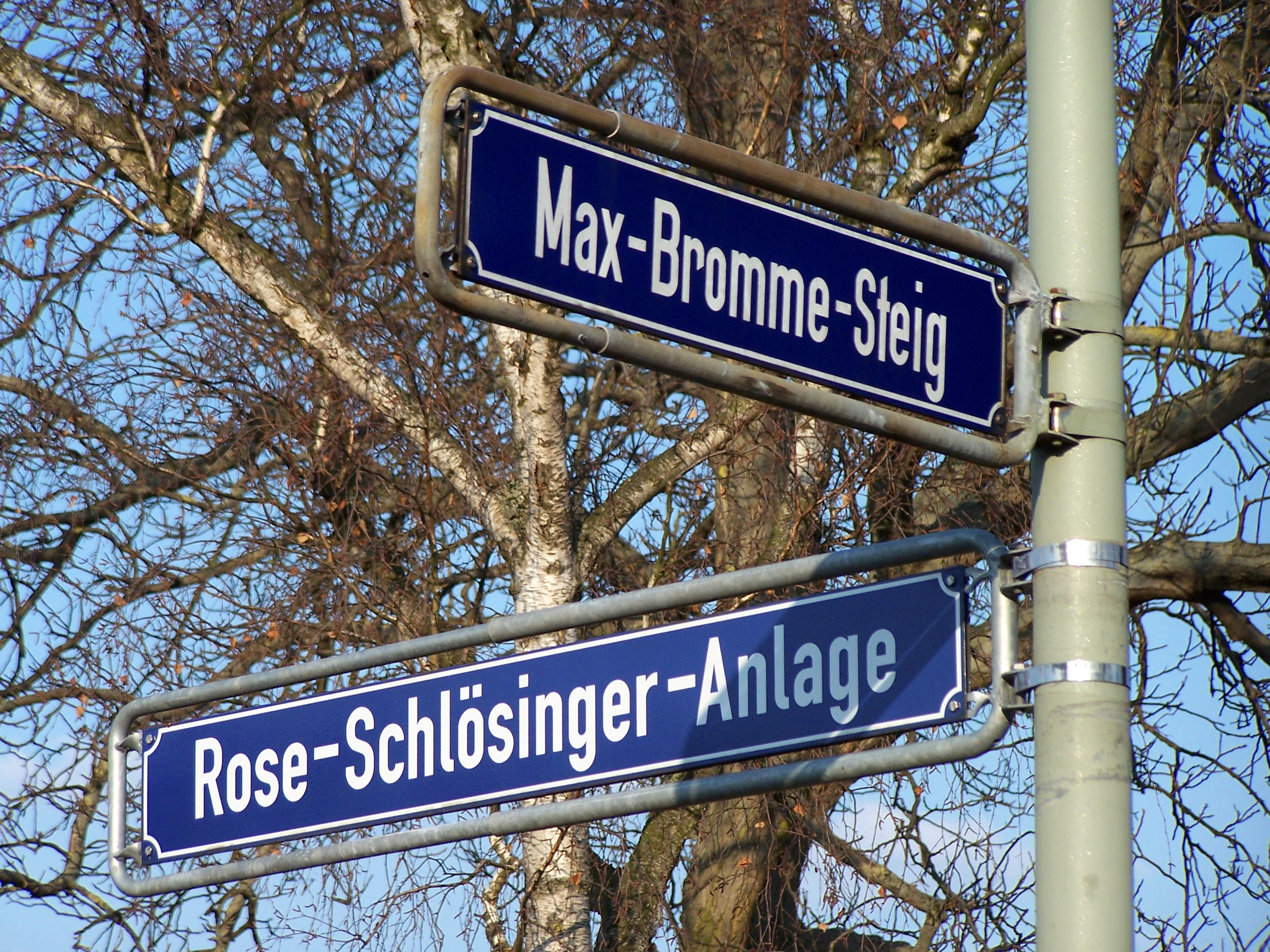
Street sign for the park named after Schlösinger on Bornheimer Hang

In 1936 Rose married Bodo Schlösinger, a translator who was part of an anti-Nazi group headed by Arvid Harnack. The pair aided the underground resistance and by 1937 she was working with communists from Berlin associated with the Red Orchestra. She forwarded encrypted messages from Harnack to radio operator Hans Coppi. After the resistance group was discovered by Nazi intelligence, she was arrested in October 1942. The Reich War Tribunal gave her a death sentence on 20 January 1943. Her husband killed himself after learning of the sentence. Schlösinger was beheaded with a guillotine on 5 August 1943 at Plötzensee Prison in Berlin.

In 1969, Schlösinger was posthumously awarded the Soviet Order of the Red Star.

== Farewell letter ==
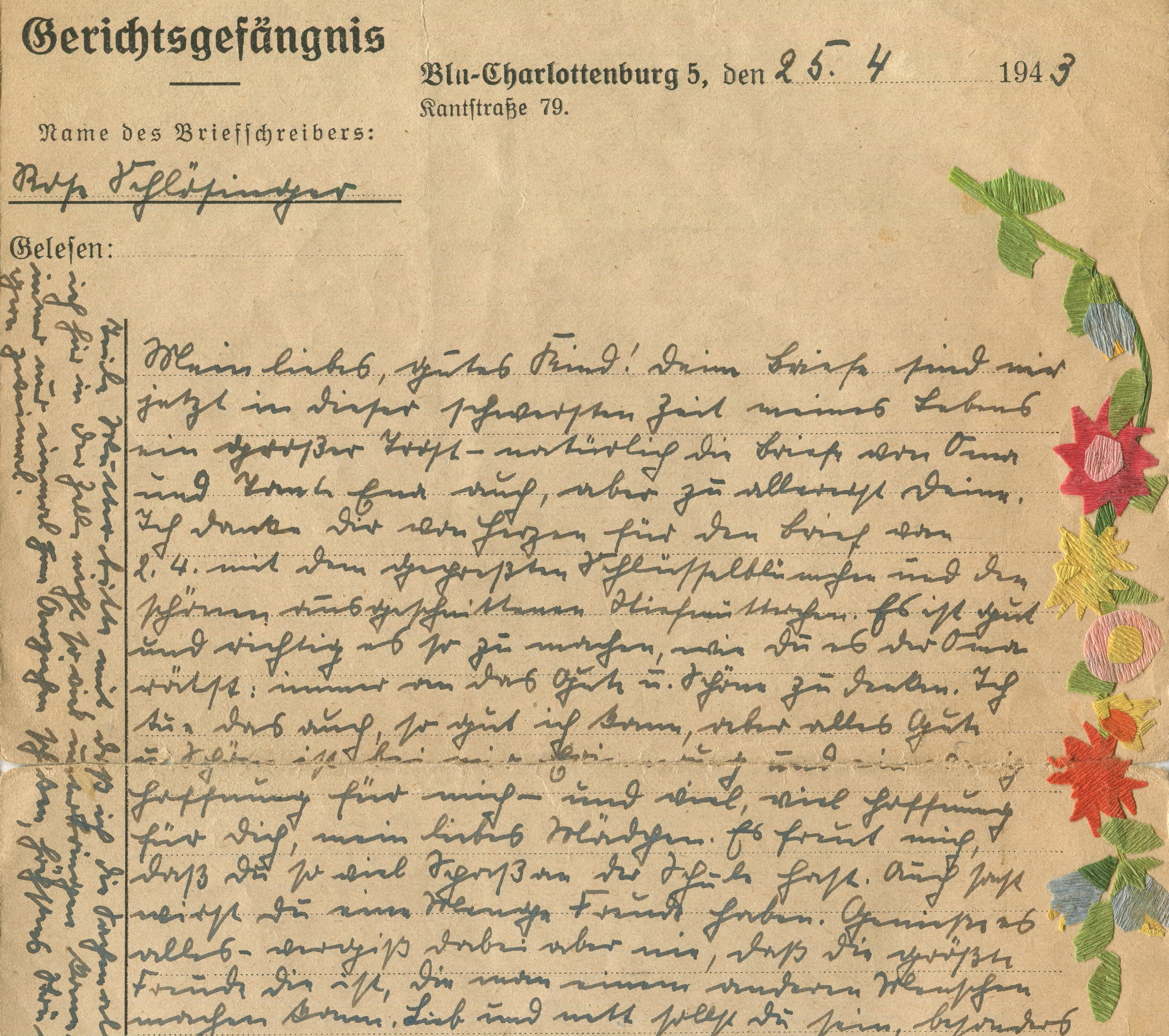
Easter letter to daughter Marianne

Shortly before her execution, Schlösinger wrote a farewell letter to her daughter Marianne.

"My dear little big Marianne,

... I hope that you will grow up to be a healthy, happy and strong human being. I hope you will experience the most beautiful things the world has to give... And then you must have children... And think of our evenings of discussion in bed, about all the important things of life... And think of our beautiful three weeks at the seashore - of the sunrise, and when we walked barefoot along the beach from Bansin to Uckeritz, and when I pushed you before me on the rubber float, and when we read books together. We had so many beautiful things together, my child, and you must experience them all over again, and much more besides... And be happy as often as you can - every day is precious.

My love for you shall accompany you your whole life long."

== See also ==
- People of the Red Orchestra
