= Ingeborg Kummerow =

Berlin office worker and resistance activist (1912–1943)

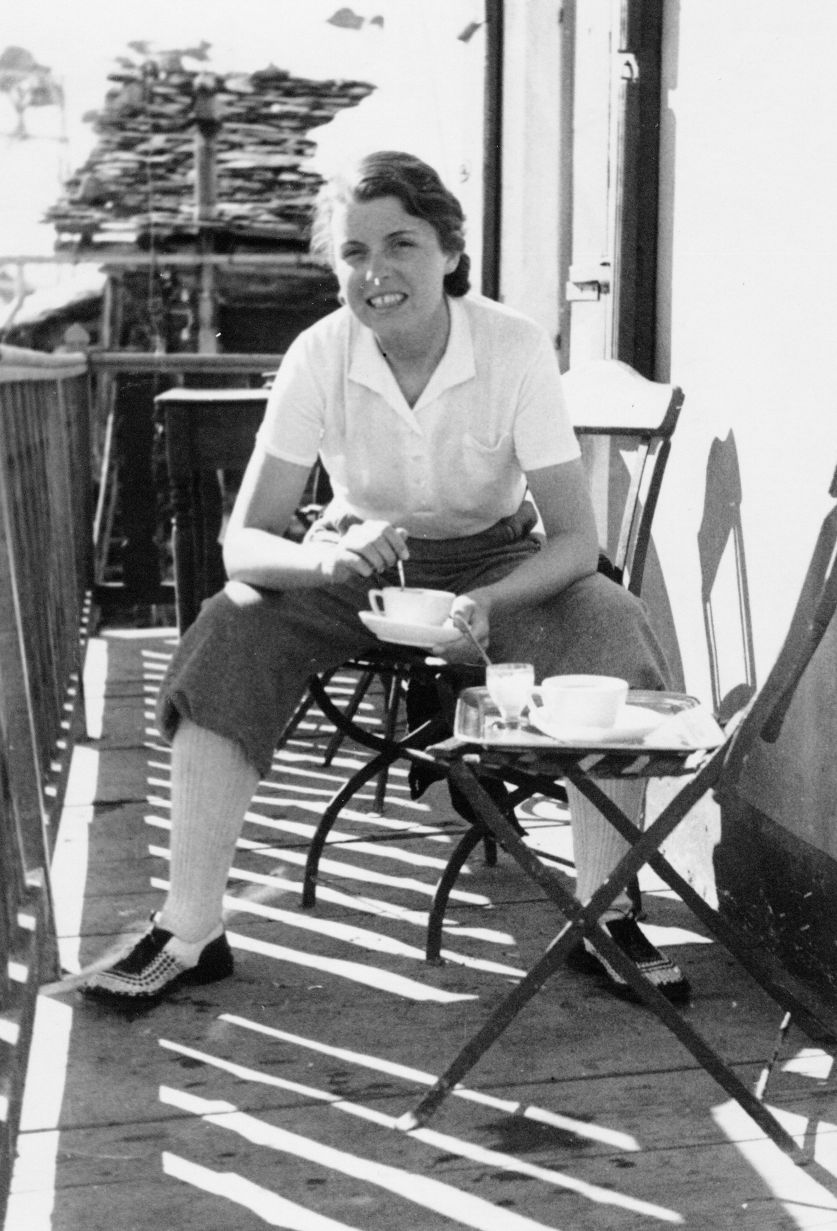
- Ingeborg Kummerow on holiday in Italy
- Born: Ingeborg Mathilde Dolores Picker; 23 August 1912; Hamburg-Rahlstedt, Germany
- Died: 5 August 1943 (aged 30); Plötzensee Prison, Berlin-Charlottenburg-Wilmersdorf, Germany
- Occupation: Office worker
- Known for: Circumstances of her execution
- Spouse: Hans-Heinrich Kummerow (1903-1944)
- Children: 2
- Parents: Conrad Martin Adolf Picker (father); Mathilde Sophie Mariane Louise Schnitter (mother)

Ingeborg Mathilde Dolores Kummerow (née Picker; 23 August 1912 - 5 August 1943) was a Berlin office worker and housewife who, in 1936, had married Dr Hansheinrich Kummerow, a high-flying telecommunications engineer, employed in the research and development department at Loewe-Radio-AG. The couple had two sons.

Loewe was an electronics company which had taken a lead in developing televisions technology, but which was by this time increasingly concentrating on defence related telecommunications technology.

It was through her husband that Ingeborg became involved in anti-government resistance. She was one of a batch of 17 guillotined at Plötzensee Prison on 5 August 1943, aged 30. Sources giving the date of her execution, incorrectly, as 5 August 1944 are believed to be based on a self-perpetuating error.

== Life ==
Ingeborg Mathilde Dolores Picker was born in Hamburg-Neu-Rahlstedt a couple of years before the First World War broke out. Conrad Martin Adolf Picker, her father, was a businessman.

She married the scientist Hansheinrich Kummerow on 24 October 1936, three and a half years after the coming to power of the Hitler government. Although he had shown no interest in politics before 1933, and never became a member of any political party, Kummerow had reacted to the changes of 1933 by teaming up with the illegal communist resistance group around Hans Coppi and Erhard Tohmfor. His work in the research and development department of the electronics company Loewe-Radio-AG gave him opportunities, which between 1933 and 1941 he took, to commit acts of sabotage against the German armaments industry. He was able to obtain important technical-economic information for the intelligence services of the Soviet Union and the British Empire.

After the German army unexpectedly invaded the Soviet Union in June 1941, Hans-Heinrich Kummerow made contact with Harro Schulze-Boysen and Arvid Harnack in order to use their intelligence network to pass battle-sensitive information across to the Soviet army. This made him a member of the so-called "Rote Kapelle" (loosely, "Red Orchestra") a term devised by the security services to group together anti-government activists believed to be working for Soviet intelligence. The term implies a degree of coherence and central control (implicitly from Moscow) that never corresponded to the reality of the various disparate antifascist pro-communist groupings that gathered support in Germany during the war, but it has nevertheless endured, and was highly effective during and directly after the war in persuading many in Germany that being anti-Hitler meant being both unpatriotic and pro-Moscow. The security services arrested Hansheinrich Kummerow in November 1942 in the context of a massive manhunt targeting those identified as "Rote Kapelle" ("Red Orchestra") members. Between the end of August 1942 and November 1942 they arrested more than 50 women and 70 men.

Ingeborg Kummerow was arrested and imprisoned a few weeks after her husband, during November/December 1942. According to a man identified as "Detective Superintendent Struebing", who was interrogated at length in 1951 by Lüneburg prosecutor Hans-Jürgen Finck, (Note: Finck's report ended up in the hands of American intelligence, and was for many years kept secret by them.) Ingeborg Kummerow was arrested "after her husband stated in his interrogation that she typed up the engineering secrets he passed on to Russian parachute agents". (Hans-Heinrich Kummerow was "terribly mistreated by the Gestapo" during his own interrogation sessions, and attempted suicide three times as a result, possibly in order to avoid being forced to implicate his wife.) The report of testimony given by Struebing also states that, after her own arrest, Ingeborg Kummerow admitted that she knew of her husband's contacts with Soviet agents and was aware of the "true aims of his activities". Although this declassified US intelligence report provides a level of detail that otherwise would not be readily accessible, it also includes indications that the report writer did not regard "Detective Superintendent Struebing" himself as a particularly reliable witness.

On Wednesday, 27 January 1943, Ingeborg Kummerow faced a court. However, because she had been identified as a suspected "Rote Kapelle" ("Red Orchestra") member, it was a court martial that she faced. She was convicted under a charge of aiding and abetting espionage ("... wegen Beihilfe zur Spionage"), and sentenced to death..

An appeal for clemency was submitted by Ingeborg Kummerow and sixteen others condemned to death following identification by the authorities as members of the "Rote Kapelle". The appeal found its way to the leader, who, on 21 July 1943, personally turned it down without comment. Loss of constitutional civil rights was added to the death sentence.

5 August 1943 was a particularly fine summer's day in the Berlin region. Towards the end of that afternoon fourteen women and girls were driven across town to the Plötzensee execution facility. There was a period of waiting, but during the early evening, at 19.00, executions began on the guillotine. Three men were executed first, followed by the fourteen women and girls. Executions took place approximately at three minute intervals. At 17.39 Ingeborg Kummerow became the fifteenth of the seventeen to be executed. Before 17.50, the scheduled killings had all been performed.
