= Frida Wesolek =

- Born: Frida Hübner; 3 September 1887; Sommerfeld, German Empire (now Lubsko, Poland)
- Died: 5 August 1943 (aged 55); Plötzensee Prison; Berlin, Nazi Germany
- Cause of death: Decapitation
- Occupations: Resistance member, seamstress
- Known for: Member of Rote Kapelle (Red Orchestra resistance group
- Political party: Communist Party of Germany
- Movement: Communist International
- Spouse: Stanislaus Wesolek
- Children: 2
- Father: Emil Hübner
- Relatives: Arthur Hübner (brother)

Frida Wesolek, born Frida Hübner (3 September 1887 in Lubsko, Zary County – 5 August 1943 in Plötzensee, Berlin), was a German resistance fighter against Nazism.

== Biography ==
Frida Wesolek trained and worked as a seamstress. Like her father, Emil Hübner, she initially joined the Social Democratic Party of Germany (SPD). In 1919, she, her father and her husband, Stanislaus Wesolek, all transferred their party allegiance to the Communist Party of Germany (KPD). Her younger brother, Arthur Hübner (1899 –1962), also took part in anti‑Nazi resistance activities.

From the late 1920s, Wesolek, her father and her husband were active in the Communist International organization (Comintern), which during the 1930s increasingly merged with Soviet state intelligence services. Through this work they established contacts with resistance groups associated with Adam Kuckhoff, Wilhelm Guddorf and John Sieg, as well as with the network led by Gerhard Kegel and Ilse Stöbe.

The Hübner–Wesolek household maintained technical equipment for the resistance organization, including fully operational radio transmitters, and unlike some other couriers they were formally trained in their use. However, following the military's front setbacks and the disorganization in the Soviet Union, their direct link to the Union was severed in the summer of 1941.

In the summer of 1942, the family sheltered German communists who had returned from the USSR, housing them in their place in Rudow and collaborated closely with members of the Berlin Red Orchestra. This involvement led to their arrest in the wave of detentions that began in early September 1942. On 18 October 1942, Frida Wesolek, her husband Stanislaus and her father Emil were arrested. On 10 February 1943, the 2nd Senate of the Reichskriegsgericht, under prosecutor Manfred Roeder, sentenced all three to death by guillotine. Their elder son, Johannes Wesolek, received a six‑year prison sentence, while their younger son, Walter Wesolek, was released.

The death sentences were carried out on 5 August 1943 at Plötzensee Prison, alongside the executions of Adam Kuckhoff and fourteen other members of the Berlin Red Orchestra. Prior to her arrest, Frida Wesolek resided at Schröderdamm 9 (now Leuschnerdamm 9) in Kreuzberg, and her death certificate recorded her as “gottgläubig”. In 1969, she was posthumously awarded the Soviet Order of the Patriotic War, Second Class.

== Readings ==
- Rosiejka, Gert (1986). Die Rote Kapelle : "Landesverrat" als antifaschist. Widerstand. Ergebnisse, 33. (in German) (1st ed.). Hamburg: Ergebnisse-Verl. ISBN 3-925622-16-0. OCLC 74741321.
- Perrault, Gilles (1969). The Red Orchestra. New York: Schocken Books. ISBN 0805209522. OCLC 797147560.
- Trepper, Léopold (1995). Die Wahrheit: Autobiographie des "Grand Chef" der Roten Kapelle (in German). Ahriman-Verlag GmbH. ISBN 978-3-89484-554-4. OCLC 34026904.
