= Husemann =

Husemann is a surname of German origin, being a variant of the surname Hausmann, which originated as an occupational surname for a servant or administrator who worked at a great house. Notable people with the surname include:

- Fritz Husemann (1873–1935), German trade union leader and politician
- Marta Husemann (1913–1960), German actor and resistance fighter
- Walter Husemann (1909–1943), German communist and resistance fighter
- Werner Husemann (1919–2014), German night fighter ace

== See also ==
- Hausmann
- Huseman
