= Hanna Berger =

Austrian dancer and choreographer (1910-1962)

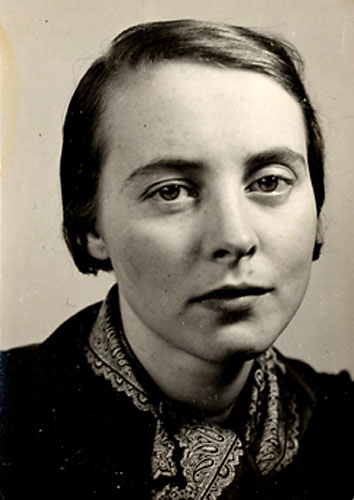
- Hanna Berger, German Dance Archive Cologne
- Born: Johanna Elisabeth Hochleitner-Köllchen; 23 August 1910; Vienna, Austro-Hungarian Empire
- Died: 15 January 1962 (aged 51); East Berlin, East Germany
- Known for: Dance, choreography and film directing
- Movement: Modern dance

Hanna Berger (born Johanna Elisabeth Hochleitner-Köllchen; 23 August 1910 – 15 January 1962) was an Austrian dancer, choreographer, teacher, director, theatre director, writer and lifelong anti-Nazi and communist. She was described as part of the free dance movement.

== Life ==
Johanna Elisabeth née Hochleitner-Köllchen was the child of Maria Hochleitner was illegitimate. Her father was described as coming from the bourgeois social class and she would later describe him as being the wealthy Eduard Wolfram. Hochleitner's husband was railway worker Wilhelm Köllchen. As a child she was baptised a Roman Catholic. She spent the first years of her childhood partly with her grandfather and partly with her mother in the working-class district of Meidling in Vienna. At the age of eight, she was formally adopted by Köllchen and lived with her parents. When she was six years old, caught tuberculosis, that affected her eye. As a child she was subject to abject poverty that coloured her whole existence, resulting in her developing a human condition which she described as "hypersensitivity and a longing for art" ("Überempfindsamkeit und Sehnsucht nach Kunst").

From the age 14 she started to receive piano lessons. At the age of 16, she married Leopold Berger, a machinist, but the marriage did not last and the couple separated almost a year later. She decided to keep her married name but was never formally divorced until 1943. She never married again. From 1927 to 1928 she was a member of the Communist Party of Austria. From 1929 to 1934 she studied gymnastics modern dance in Berlin along with Jonny Ahemm, Vera Skoronel, Gertrud Wienecke and Mary Wigman in Dresden. To make a living and to afford her fees, she would give dance lessons working under the name Hanna Wolfram and work as a masseuse.

In 1929 she met the sculptor Fritz Cremer, who was a committed communist. They became partners in a relationship that lasted until 1950, when Cremer decided to move to the new East Germany. They split for a number of reasons. Cremer did not like the "Americanisation" of Vienna and increased focus on communists who were being stigmatised. The other more important reason was the scandal over the memorial to the victims of fascism at the Vienna Central Cemetery. The memorial represented a naked bronze figure of a resistance fighter, which was considered controversial by church members. Theodor Innitzer, the Archbishop of Vienna wanted a fig leaf placed on the sculpture, which Cremer did not accept. Another reason for the couples split was Cremer's many affairs.

== Artistic career ==
Her first engagements as a professional contemporary dancer took her on tour with Mary Wigman in 1935 She danced in the Women's Dances (Frauentänze) cycle, ("The Seer", "Witches' Dance"), among others. In 1936 she was a member of Trudi Schoop troupe and danced in his choreographies "Zur Annoncengabe" and "Fridolin unterwegs!" during a long tour of the United States and in London and Zurich. She completed her knowledge of modern dance during several months at the German Master Studio for Dance (Deutschen Meisterstätten für Tanz) in Berlin, where she attended classes in theatre directing, ballet, character and national dance.

By 1936, she was a sworn anti-Nazi and this was confirmed when she wrote articles using the pseudonym "The Stage Artist" titled: "Dance in the Stadium" ("Tanz im Stadion") and "About German dance and its real content" ("Über den deutschen Tanz und seine realen Inhalte") for the Swiss theatre magazine Der Bühnenkünstler, where she attacked Nazi cultural policy. Among other things, it states:

"Truth is always unpleasant to National Socialism, whether it is expressed in a work of art or in discussions at stampedes."

On 11 October 1937, she made her evening debut as a choreographer and dancer as part of an eleven-part solo at the Berlin Bach-Saal. She performed a set of dances under specific themes, "Three Romantic Studies: Summer, Late Summer, Summer in Paris", "Everyday Story: Girl, Lover, Abandoned Mother, Mourning Woman". At the critical time of her solo, she danced one of her best-known dances, the "Solo Krieger", to music by Ulrich Kessler The dance had been banned by the Nazis and was only shown due to the exigency of the Austrian ambassador, who was patron of the event. On the 18 October 1937, the solo dance was reviewed by Dietrich Dibelius in the Frankfurter Zeitung (Number 531) in a piece titled: "Kritik zum Debüt-Abend von Hanna Berger anlässlich einer Aufführung des Tanzsolos Krieger op. 13" where he stated:

"The dancer wore a field gray coat, soldier's cap and boots. The noisy music that her companion Ulrich Kessler wrote for this dance consisted of a march-like drumming motif that the soldier obeyed with stamping steps, and now and then a bright, lingering metallic ringing that caused him to duck his head for a moment to press one's chin into one's uniform collar as if to face the threat of a nearby missile; immediately afterwards the old defiant rhythm again. Finally the soldier is hit - a sudden pause - but he only falls when, always under the spell of the march rhythm, he has answered the enemy with a wide swing. War is represented here in the image of an enduring, silent heroism."

Berger's solo dance was not well received by the Nazis and she was forced to flee from Nazi Germany to Vienna. Her Vienna debut took place in December 1937 at the great hall of the Urania. She found support and protection in the form of city counciller Viktor Matejka who recognised the nature of her dance as being militant and politically expressive and offered her a safe place to dance at the Volksheim Ottakring. On 5 February 1938, Berger performed the "Krieger" for a second time at the Volksheim Ottakring in Vienna. The dance was reviewed by an editor in conversation with Berger, in Workers-Weekly (Arbeiter-Woche) newspaper stating that everybody present must have developed disgust for war. Dance critic and author Andrea Amort stated that:

"the audience was able to recognise the horror of a war and not its indispensable necessity and transfiguration, as suggested by National Socialist Germany". Hanna Berger's point with this dance was to depict the murderous reality of warlike conflicts. In this way, it could be seen as a call to the soldiers to break free from foreign domination and act on their own responsibility".

In 1938, shortly before the annexation of Austria by Germany on 13 March 1938, she followed Fritz Cremer to Rome. She taught at the Royal Academy of Dramatic Art in Rome. After six months she passed the examination for an academic post and she was promoted to a position of professor. Through the aegis of the Royal Academy, she choreographed and danced in Florence and Messina and eventually all over Italy.

With the coming of World War II, her situation changed her plans. In Berlin, she continued to dance, give lessons in gymnastics and piano as well as acting and modelling to make money. At personal sacrifice, she held the occasional dance evening which attracted the attention of the Gestapo. In 1940, she danced the cycle "Italian Journey" ("Italienische Reise") in the Academy of Dramatic Art in Rome. A year later, she danced in the Theatre on the Kurfürstendamm with Marianne Vogelsang. In the years between 1941 and 1942, she staged "The Unknown from the Seine" ("Die Unbekannte aus der Seine") in eight scenes. On 30 May 1943, she held her own dance evening in the Theatre on the Kurfürstendamm. On several dates in October 1942, she danced at the Schiller Theater under the direction of Heinrich George. She also danced with the actors Will Quadflieg and Ernst Legal. To assuage and evade the Reich Chamber of Culture and the Gestapo, she named her work as "historical dances".

== Nazi resistance ==
From 1937, both Berger and Cremer were involved in anti-nazi communist resistance in Berlin, in a group that later became known as the Red Orchestra ("Rote Kapelle"). Berger would occasionally use her apartment for meetings, located at 48 Düsseldorfer Strasse, that would include the communist sculptor Kurt Schumacher and the actor Wilhelm Schürmann-Horster the sculptor Ruthild Hahne, the dancer Oda Schottmüller and the merchant Wolfgang Thiess. Cremer's studio was also used as a meeting place where resistance material would be exchanged. Through Hans Coppi, a friend of Schürmann-Horster, Berger was linked to Harro Schulze-Boysen. The group had a strong belief in the superiority of communism over capitalism and fascism. However, Berger's dancing was interrupted when she was arrested on 24 October 1942 in Poznań "on suspicion of preparing high treason" and spent several months in prison in Berlin from November 1942 to August 1943.

At her home, 88 communist books and books by banned authors were found by the Gestapo search, for example Karl Marx's "Das Kapital". Also found was a manuscript written by Berger titled: "About German dance and its real contents" (Über den deutschen Tanz und seine realen Inhalte) in which she criticised the Nazi cultural appropriation of dance in Germany along with its attendant rules and offered suggestions in how it should be changed. On her indictment she was blamed for "enabling subversive communist gatherings in her home".

Her trial took place at the Berlin People's Court (Volksgerichtshof). Berger managed to survive her trial due to her skillful defence, presenting herself as politically completely inexperienced. Many people interceded to testify on her behalf as character witnesses, including her mother, Cremer, students, friends and prominent personalities, including the dancer Marianne Vogelsang who all focused on presenting her as a true artist who was dedicated to her art. This resulted in a lack of evidence of any communist activities and Berger was not sentenced to death like several of her resistance friends. (Note: For a detailed description of the trial and the intercession of her supporters which saved her life, please reference: Gisela Notz, Das kämpferische Leben der Tänzerin Johanna (Hanna) Berger (1910-1962) p.149-154) Instead she was acquitted of the main charge on 23 August 1943 and sentenced to two years' hard labour. She managed to escape during her transfer to Ravensbrück concentration camp when Berlin was bombed. Despite her injuries she was able to be back in Vienna by the 15 September 1943.

== After the war and becoming famous ==
After the war she worked as a dance critic and a dancing and film screenplay author. On the 16 May 1945, Berger re-founded the anti-authoritarian Vienna Children's Theatre of which Christine Ostermayer, Klaus Löwitsch and Gerhard Senft had been known, a position she held until 1950. On 15 September, she opened the theatre with the play "The Brave Little Tailor". On 15 June 1945, for the first time, Berger danced in the Great Concert Hall in Vienna with the dance "Solidarity Song" (Solidaritätslied). It had been written by Brecht and Eisler for the Kuhle Wampe film. The music was sung by the choir of the Free Austrian Youth. In October, she was appointed to the position of dance teacher at the Vienna University of Music and Performing Arts. In November 1945, she took an active part in the first post-war elections in Austria and became a well known figure.

In 1946, Berger discovered that Fritz Cremer was still imprisoned, in Yugoslavia and managed to get help from the Communist Party of Austria to free him. Cremer arrived in Vienna in the autumn of 1946. In 1950, Cremer moved to the German Democratic Republic and took over the master class at the Academy of the Arts which effectively ended their relationship.

The years between 1945 and 1952 were to be her most creative and productive, when she became a recognised celebrity while openly showing her political convictions. During this period she danced solo performances in a number of cities in Europe in Berlin, Zurich, Vienna, Paris and Rome, as well as different places in the countries of Czechoslovakia, Poland and Hungary. In 1949, the German Democratic Republic was founded. Berger was drawn to the new country and considered moving there. This was due to the increasingly hostile climate that developed in Austria to communists and those who worked for Soviet institutions and they were being stigmatised. During this time, she danced "Unknown from the Seine" (Unbekannte aus der Seine) as well as "Madonna" and "Battle Cry" (Kampfruf) "The Unknown" (Unbekannte). In 1952, due to the reactionary climate, she was dismissed from the University of Music and Performing Arts. In the next two years, due to a black list, Berger was unable to find work in Austria in any US backed production. She was able to work in other countries, teaching in Sicily and Sardinia and then later in Vienna and Berlin until the late 1950s.

In 1956 Berger took over the position of movement director of Janáček's opera "The Cunning Little Vixen", directed by Walter Felsenstein in the GDR. Her efforts to be firmly ordered as a director under Felsenstein ended in failure. Until her ultimate death, she commuted between Vienna, Paris, Italy, the GDR and other socialist countries with no permanent home or residence. Her communist convictions remained an obstacle to her greater career.

After Fritz Cremer, the Viennese composer Paul Kont became her life partner. With him, she founded the Vienna Chamber Dance Group in or around 1954. He also wrote the music to three dance pieces, among other things, including "Dance ads" by Schoop in 1956 and "The sad hunter" and "Amores Pastorals" in 1958, which was choreographed and put on Austrian television.

By studying film design at the Vienna Music Academy from 1955 to 1957, she hoped for a new career as a filmmaker. On behalf of the City of Vienna, she was able to study with Marcel Marceau in Paris. As one of the first of his students, she earned a teaching diploma. She also performed work by Grete Wiesenthal.

== Death ==
In the last years of her career, Hanna Berger turned to expressive dance with new possibilities of freedom and development. She was not interested in artistic divisions and always used the means and methods that seemed right to her. Her last important performances as a dancer were in East Berlin at the Berliner Ensemble in 1956 and in Vienna for two performances at the Ehrbar Hall as part of International Women's Day in 1961.

Hanna Berger died on 15 January 1962 at the East Berlin Charité Hospital, while being operated on for a second brain tumour. She is buried in a grave of honour in the Meidling Cemetery in the City of Vienna.

== Reception ==
Hanna Berger has fallen into oblivion, but since her rediscovery in Vienna in 1995 with a new interpretation of Bergers solo choreography L'Inconnue de la Seine Op. 27 to Claude Debussy's piano piece "Reflets dans l’eau aus der Images" (Vol. 1) by Ottilie Mitterhuber and danced by Esther Koller. She is considered one of the great names in free dance, alongside Grete Wiesenthal and Rosalia Chladek. Hanna Berger incorporates aspects of many styles and forms of art into her works. Her solos dances focus on the feeling of a situation she expresses with an apparent minimum of technique. They are not permanently choreographed, some moments are defined, others must be improvised freely by the dancer or dancer. A politically committed artist, she also often incorporates political elements into her solos.

As part of the production "Dances of outlaws" of Esther Linley, in 1995 this solo was a central role at the Linzer Posthof. In 2000 Mitterhuber reconstructed the Berger solo "mimosa" (Casella) again danced by Esther Koller. The exhibition program "Dance in exile" was curated by Andrea Amort at the Vienna Academy Theatre during the festival tanz2000.at & ImPulsTanz. The program "Hanna Berger: Retouchings” was curated in 2006 by Andrea Amort at the Festspielhaus St. Pölten in Sankt Pölten. Fragmentary works by Berger were choreographed as new creations by Nicholas Adler, Manfred Aichinger, Bernd R. Bienert, Rose Breuss and Willi Dorner. The program was shown at festivals in Washington, Braunschweig and Vienna. Esther Koller danced "L'Inconnue de la Seine" in the 2011 opening of an exhibition for the achievements of women teaching at the University of Music and Performing Arts, Vienna.

In 2010, Andrea Amort, a historian and professor at the Vienna Conservatory, published Hanna Berger, Spuren einer Tonzerin im Widerstand, after extensive research that led to the discovery of several previously unknown archive documents. Esther Koller danced L'Unknown de la Seine in 2011 for the opening of an exhibition at the Vienna University of Music and Performing Arts. In 2019, as part of the Alles tanzt exhibition. Kosmos Wiener Tanzmoderne at the Vienna Theatre Museum, Eva-Maria Schaller presents a long version of the Unknown of the Seine.

== Bibliography ==
- Andrea Amort, Mimi Wunderer-Gosch (Hrsg.): Österreich tanzt. Geschichte und Gegenwart. Böhlau Verlag, Wien/ Köln/ Weimar 2001, ISBN 3-205-99226-1.
- Andrea Amort: Free Dance in Interwar Vienna. In: Deborah Holmes, Lisa Silverman (Hrsg.): Interwar Vienna. Culture between Tradition and Modernity. Camden House, New York 2009, ISBN 978-1-57113-420-2, S. 117–142.
- Andrea Amort: Hanna Berger. Spuren einer Tänzerin im Widerstand. Christian Brandstätter Verlag, Wien 2010, ISBN 978-3-85033-188-3
- Amort, Andrea, ed. (2019). Alles tanzt Kosmos Wiener Tanzmoderne (in German) (1st ed.). Berlin: Hatje Cantz. pp. 204–227. ISBN 9783775745673.
- Fischer, Eva-Elisabeth (23 June 2006). "Die Unbekannte aus dem Sozialismus" (in German). Südwestdeutsche Medien Holding. Süddeutsche Zeitung.
- Gisela Notz: Das Kämpferische Leben der Tänzerin Johanna (Hanna) Berger (1910–1962). In: Jahrbuch für Forschungen zur Geschichte der Arbeiterbewegung. Heft III/2012.

== See also ==
- Oda Schottmüller
