= Hans Coppi =

German resistance member (1916–1942)

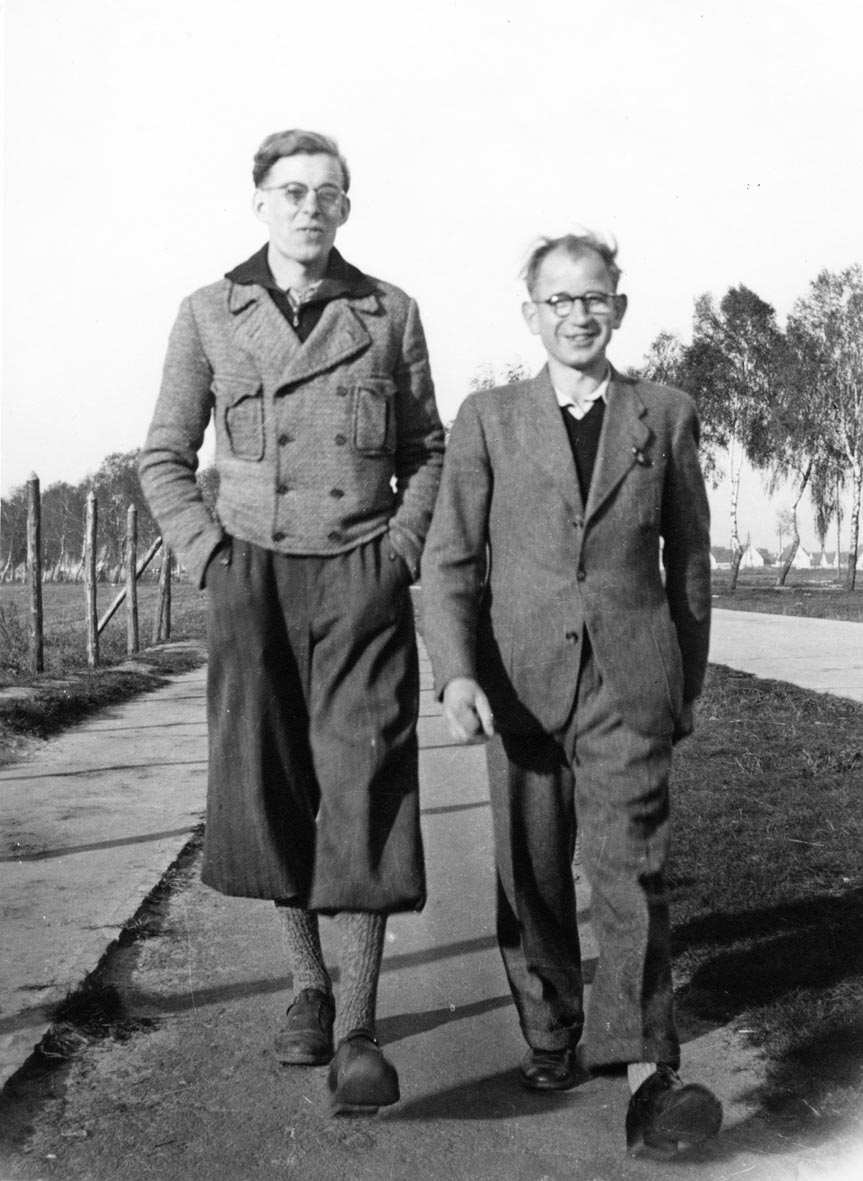
- Hans Coppi on the left. Taken in Velten in 1940
- Born: 25 January 1916; Berlin, German Empire
- Died: 22 December 1942 (aged 26); Plötzensee Prison, Berlin, Nazi Germany
- Cause of death: Execution by hanging
- Education: Schulfarm Insel Scharfenberg
- Occupation: Machinist
- Spouse: Hilde Coppi
- Children: Hans Coppi Jr.

Hans-Wedigo Robert Coppi (25 January 1916 – 22 December 1942) was a German resistance fighter against the Nazis. He was a member of a Berlin-based anti-fascist resistance group that was later called the Red Orchestra by the Gestapo.

== Life ==
Coppi was born in Wedding, Berlin to a working-class family. His parents were Robert Coppi, a house painter who specialised in lacquer cutting and gilding and Frieda née Schön (1884–1961), a seamstress and dressmaker who worked to supplement the family income. Both his parents were ardent communists who in 1930, became members of the Communist Party of Germany (KPD). This resulted in Coppi becoming politicised at an early age and that led to him becoming a communist activist and later agitator. From 1929 to 1932, Coppi attended the Schulfarm Scharfenberg, a left-wing progressive "school-farm" on the island of Scharfenberg in Lake Tegel in Berlin. During 1931–32 Coppi became a member of the "Red Boy Scouts" (Roten Pfadfinder) and the Communist Youth Association of Germany (KJVD).

In November 1932, Coppi was expelled from the Scharfenberg school after supporting students who had watched Georg Wilhelm Pabst's banned Franco-German solidarity film Kameradschaft and subsequently was transferred to the Berliner Lessing-Gymnasium, a gymnasium in the Wedding area of Mitte, Berlin. In February 1933, the Coppi family moved to the newly created garden-colony known as Am Waldessaum in Borsigwalde. After he moved, he made an attempt to rebuild the KJVD organisation in Tegel, which had been banned by the state. In September 1933, with the formalisation of the Nazi state, the Sturmabteilung began to search for Coppi as he was considered an undesirable. He went into hiding and began to live an illegal existence. During that period he organised a protest campaign with his friends from Scharfenberg and Tegel to protest the Reichstag elections that were held in November 1933. In February 1934 Coppi was arrested by the Gestapo for posting illegal leaflets and sent to Oranienburg concentration camp for two months during pre-trial detention, before being sentenced for one year imprisonment in juvenile detention. After his release on 4 February 1935, he made contact with his old friends from Scharfenberg that included Hans Lautenschläger, Hermann Natterodt and Heinrich Scheel. Coppi and the group continued to co-write leaflets warning of the consequences of Nazi warmongering and Nazi rearmament. In 1935, Coppi met Hilde Coppi née Rake, a student and receptionist.

As he was no longer in full-time education, Coppi needed to work to support himself. He first worked in his mother's ice-cream parlour then as a delivery boy. In November 1938, Coppi found stable employment as a lathe operator in a small engineering factory while training to be a technician during evening class.

== World War II ==
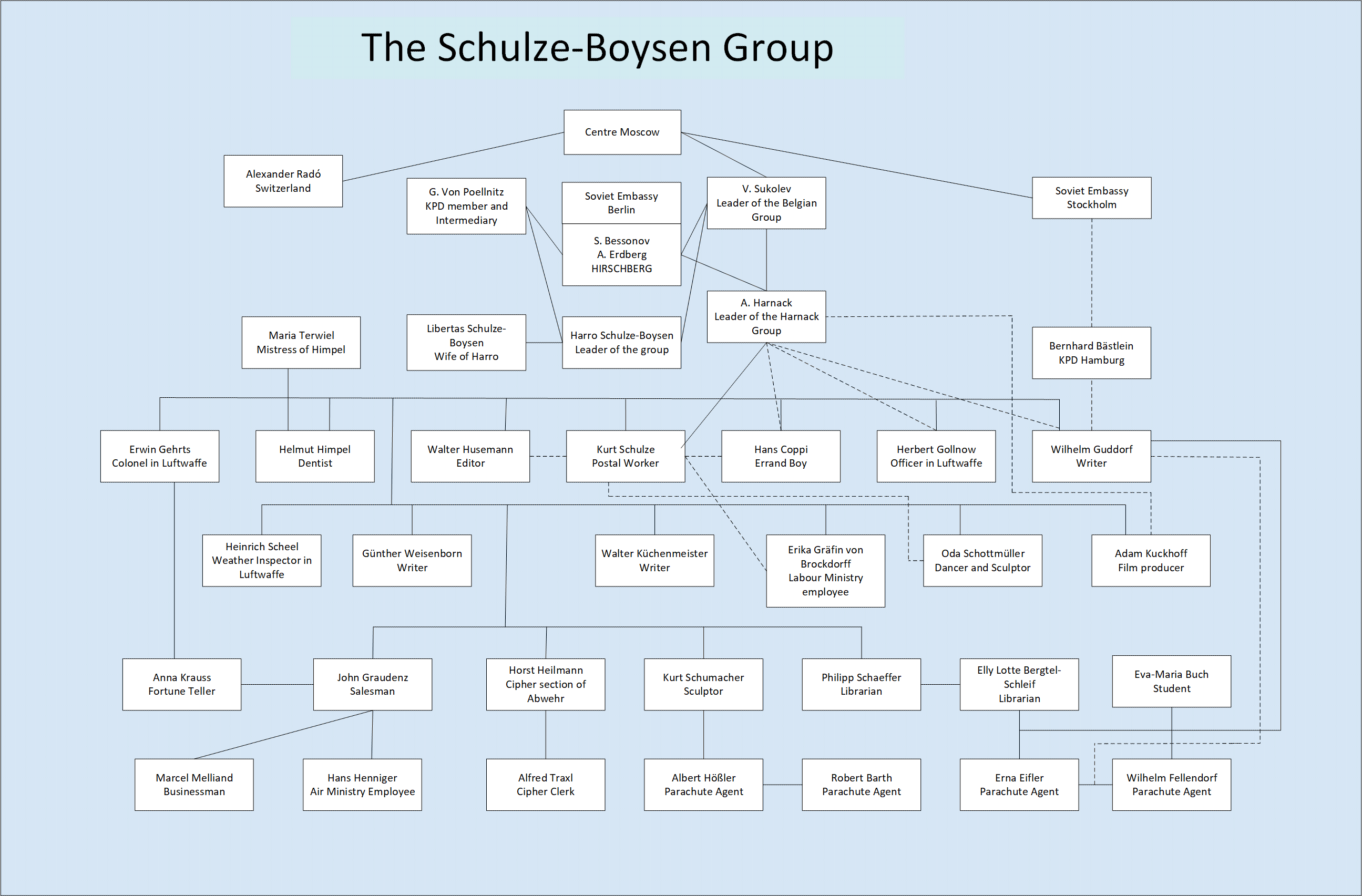
The Schulze-Boysen group in Germany

At the start of World War II, Coppi was conscripted, but was classed as "Unworthy of military service" ("Wehrunwürdiger") due to his background. Through a friend from the banned KJVD, he was introduced to the actor and dramaturge Wilhelm Schürmann-Horster's and became part of his group of friends. At regular meetings they would openly discuss current affairs, the development of the Nazi state and what it meant for them and their future. The group eventually encompassed sculptor Cay and his wife, a receptionist, Erika von Brockdorff, the sculptor Ruthild Hahne, her husband, the merchant Wolfgang Thiess, the architect Friedrich Schauer, the commercial clerk Karl Böhme, the printer Herbert Grasse and the electrician Eugen Neutert. As the war progressed the nature of the meetings changed from discussion to resistance at some point during October or November 1940. During the period from the late 1920s to mid-1930s, Schürmann-Horster was a dedicated promoter of political propaganda (agit-prop, political theatre) and had staged a number of political plays in both bars and factories. The group used these contacts of Schürmann-Horster's and their own contacts to organise a network of resistance activities in the factories and to build a resistance organisation.

On 14 June 1941, Coppi married Hilde Coppi who at the time worked as a payroll accountant in the Reichsversicherungsanstalt (Reich employee insurance corporation).

== Resistance ==
=== Schulze-Boysen/Harnack Group ===
In 1937, members of the Coppi's communist discussion group who were former students of the Scharfenberger school, were introduced to Harro Schulze-Boysen and later Arvid Harnack through Heinrich Scheel, an inspector in the Luftwaffe's Meteorological Service, who also attended Scharfenberger. and who was a close friend of Schulze-Boysen. Schulze-Boysen had been collaborating with Harnack in what was then a resistance group. In September 1940, that resistance group that would be reformulated into espionage organisation that informed on the German military and economy in the form of intelligence reports that were sent to the Soviet Union. It was planned by Schulze and Soviet intelligence that Kurt Schumacher would be the groups radio telegraphist, but he was drafted into the German army on 6 June 1941, so Schulze-Boysen asked Coppi to be the replacement radio operator in Coppi for the espionage organisation. Schulze-Boysen persuaded Coppi to establish a radio link to the Soviet Union for the resistance organisation. Karl Behrens volunteered to deliver the coded message to Coppi and be a backup operator. Both Harnack and Coppi were trained by a contact of Alexander Korotkov, in how to encode text and transmit it and Soviet espionage had settled on using the novel "Der Kurier aus Spanien" by Hans Rabl as the book cipher and a copy was entrusted to Coppi by Korotkov. Coppi collected the radio from a contact on underground station. The shortwave radio set was built into a disguised suitcase and had a battery that lasted two hours. On 26 June 1941, Coppi began transmitting and sent the greeting, "1000 Grüsse an alle Freunde" ("A thousand greetings to all friends"). Moscow replied "We have received and read your test message. The substitution of letters for numbers and vice versa is to be done using the permanent number 38745 and the codeword Schraube", and directing them to transmit at a predefined frequency and time. Coppi failed to send any other messages during that night due to inexperience and dead batteries. Coppi then incorrectly plugged the transmitter into a DC outlet to charge the batteries but instead blew the transformer and tubes up. Several technicians in the group tried to repair the unit without success.

In November 1941, Schulze-Boysen arranged through Walter Husemann to contact the communist official Kurt Schulze to arrange delivery of another radio transmitter. Schulze secured another radio transmitter of the most modern type for Coppi and trained him in its use. At the same time a courier channel between Berlin and Gurevich in Brussels was established. Coppi made several more attempts to contact Soviet intelligence, first from his own apartment. Later he moved to the dance studio of Oda Schottmüller at 106 Charlottenburg's Reichsstrasse and when this proved unsuccessful he moved to the apartment of Erika von Brockdorff at the end of 1941, early 1942 but couldn't transmit successfully. It is unknown how many attempts Coppi made in the next few months but he made no connection during the critical period of the latter-half of 1941.

=== Soviet Paradise exhibition ===
Adhesive stickers that were posted on top of The Soviet Paradise posters

In May 1942, the Nazis publicised propaganda as an exhibit known as The Soviet Paradise. Massive photo panels depicting Russian Slavs as subhuman beasts who lived in squalid conditions and of pictures of firing squads shooting young children and others who were hung, were shown at the exhibit. The group decided to respond and created a number of stickers to paste onto walls. Hans and the pregnant Hilde set out first for Lustgarten, then for Moabit then went to Wedding where they pasted the stickers. The message on the stickers that were posted over the exhibition posters was as follows:

Permanent Exhibition
The Nazi Paradise
War, Hunger, Lies, Gestapo
How much longer?

=== Parachutists ===
On 5 August 1942, Soviet NKVD agent Albert Hoessler along with Red Army Intelligence agent Robert Barth were parachuted into Germany. Hoessler had a mission to first contact Elisabeth and Kurt Schumacher and then support the group around Harro Schulze-Boysen. Schumacher introduced Hoessler to Schulze-Boysen who in turn introduced him to Coppi in an attempt to help Coppi establish radio communication. Even with Hoessler's help, who was a trained radio telegraphist, Coppi was never able to establish communication with Moscow.

== Arrest ==
On 12 September 1942, Coppi and his pregnant wife were arrested, Coppi in Schrimm, now in central Poland, after reporting for duty in the Wehrmacht, and Hilde and family in Berlin. Due to the Nazi German idea that the family shared responsibility for a crime, known as Sippenhaft, Coppi's parents Robert and Freida, his brother Kurt Coppi and his mother-in-law were also arrested. Hoessler was arrested by the Gestapo at the end of September 1942.

On 19 December 1942 the 2nd Senate of the Reichskriegsgericht sentenced Coppi to death for "preparation for high treason, favouring the enemy and espionage". Hilde gave birth to their son, Hans, on 27 November 1942, while detained at the Barnimstrasse women's prison in Berlin. The couple met for the last time at a meeting at the RSHA office. Three days later, Coppi was hanged along with fellow resistance members Arvid Harnack and Harro Schulze-Boysen at Plötzensee Prison in Berlin. Hilde was executed less than a year later, on 5 August 1943, on the same day as Ursula Goetze, Maria Terwiel, Oda Schottmüller, Rose Schlösinger, Eva-Maria Buch, Cato Bontjes van Beek, Liane Berkowitz and many others.

== Awards ==
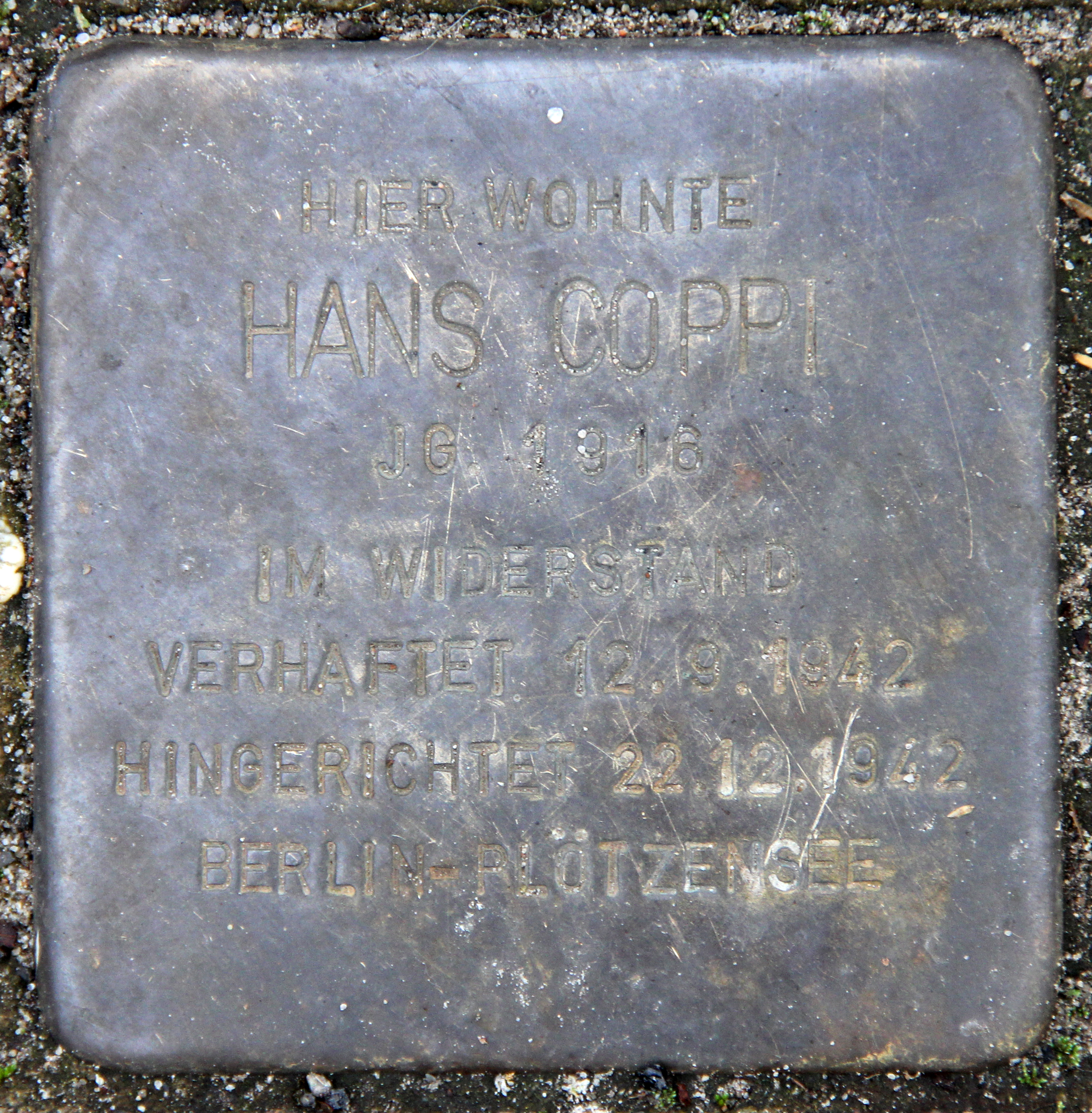
The Stolperstein (Stubling block) to honour Hans Coppi, placed at 23 Seidelstraße in Tegel in Berlin

- Coppi was posthumously awarded the Order of the Patriotic War Second Degree by the Presidium of the Supreme Soviet of the USSR on 6 October 1969.
- In 1986, a memorial plaque was placed on Scharfenberg island on Lake Tegel that commemorates him and former Scharfenberg student Hanno Günther.

== Bibliography ==
- Weiss, Peter (2016). Die Ästhetik des Widerstands Roman (in German) (1st ed.). Berlin: Suhrkamp. ISBN 9783518425510. OCLC 970660891.
- Schulze-Boysen, Harro; Coppi, Hans; Andresen, Geertje (1999). Dieser Tod passt zu mir : Harro Schulze-Boysen, Grenzgänger im Widerstand : Briefe 1915 bis 1942 (1st ed.). Berlin: Aufbau-Verlag. ISBN 9783351024932. OCLC 42432172.
- Scheel, Heinrich (1993). Vor den Schranken des Reichskriegsgerichts : mein Weg in den Widerstand (in German). Berlin: Edition Q. ISBN 9783861241478. OCLC 805310754.
- Perrault, Gilles (1990). Auf den Spuren der Roten Kapelle (in German) (Überarb. und erw. Neuausg ed.). Vienna: Europaverl. ISBN 9783203512327. OCLC 75468124.
- Rosiejka, Gert (1986). Die Rote Kapelle 'Landesverrat' als antifaschist. Widerstand (in German) (1st ed.). Hamburg: Ergebnisse Verlag. ISBN 3-925622-16-0. OCLC 497259004.
- Roloff, Stefan (2004). Die Rote Kapelle die Widerstandsgruppe im Dritten Reich und die Geschichte Helmut Roloffs. Ullstein, 36669 (in German) (1st ed.). Berlin: Ullstein. ISBN 3-548-36669-4. OCLC 76625534.

== Gallery ==
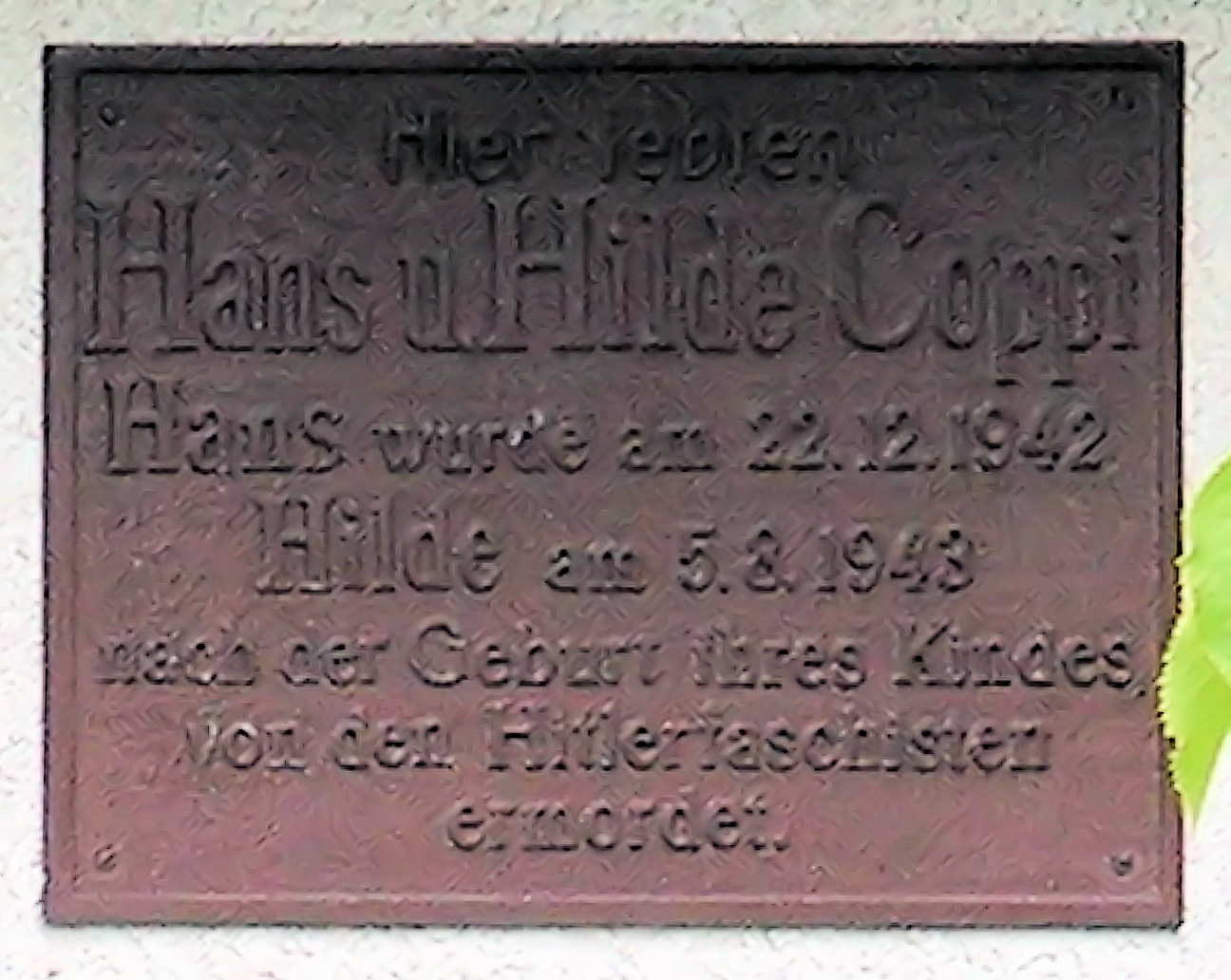
Memorial plaque for Hans and Hilde Coppi located at 23 Seidelstraße Tegel, Germany

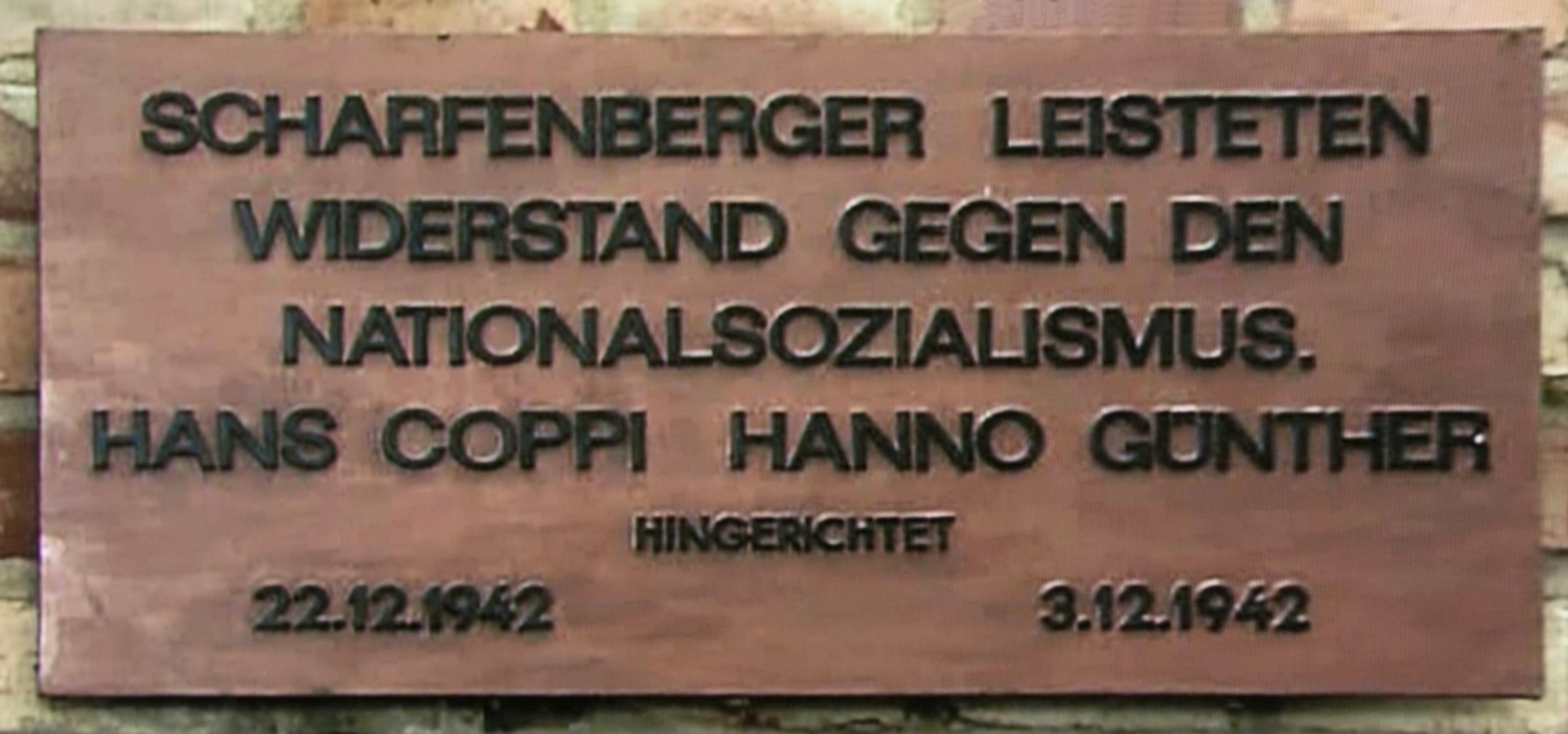
Memorial plaque, Hans Coppi, Insel Scharfenberg, Tegel, Germany

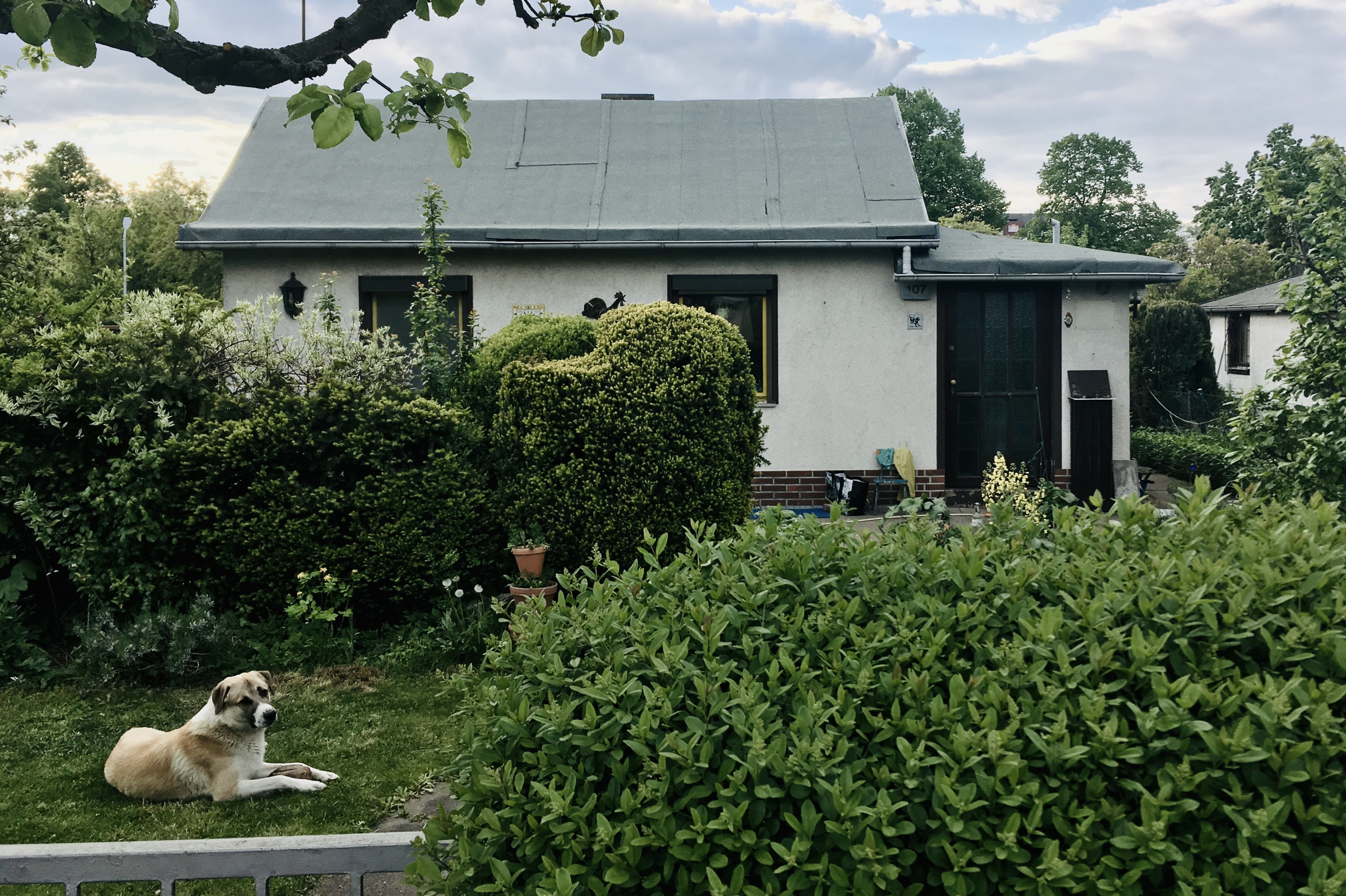
Location of plaque for Coppi at allotment garden no. 107 at 20 Seidelstraße 20

== See also ==
- Zentralfriedhof Friedrichsfelde The Socialist Memorial
