= Kurt Schulze =

German Communist and career Soviet agent

The radio telegraphist, Kurt Schulze

Kurt Schulze (28 December 1894 in Pyritz, 22 December 1942 in Plötzensee Prison) was a German postal worker and resistance fighter associated initially with the Communist International (Comintern) and then later as a career Soviet military intelligence officer. Schulze became a radio operator and trainer. He worked with an anti-fascist resistance group that was associated with Ilse Stöbe and Harro Schulze-Boysen, that was later known the Red Orchestra by the Abwehr, during the Nazi period. Schulze became a core member of the Schulze-Boysen/Harnack espionage group through Walter Husemann who knew Coppi as both attended KPD meetings in Pankow. Schulze used the code name Berg in radio communications.

== Life ==
Schulze was born in 1894 into a poor family of bakers, the seventh of ten children. His father was Hermann Schulze and his mother was Anna Schulze née Koft

In 1900, the entire family moved to Berlin. After graduating from public school in 1909, Schulze trained as a salesman for colonial goods i.e. tea, coffee, spices, sugar, chocolate, rice, cocoa and tobacco, then worked as an assistant salesman. Before Easter 1913, he'd moved to Hamburg to find work and took a job as a cabin boy on a ship bound for Venezuela. A year later, he returned to Germany and worked as an employee in various places. In May 1916, he was conscripted into the Imperial German Navy in Kiel, and received an education as a radio telegraphist (WT) and aircraft radio operator on the light cruiser SMS Stuttgart. After the end of World War I, he was unemployed. From 1920, he worked at his father's company as a driver for a cargo taxi. In the same year, he became a member of the Communist Party of Germany (KPD). Until 1928, he was a member of the Pankow KPD workers' association in Berlin, where he met Walter Husemann.

Between 1929 and 1931, Schulze worked for the AM-Apparat of the Comintern in Brandenburg. During 1929, he was recruited by the GRU and visited Moscow, where he learned radio cipher techniques. When he returned, Schulze became the main point man for Soviet intelligence in Berlin on questions of WT. During the next decade he received at least 3 sets for distribution from officials either based at the Soviet embassy or from the Soviet trade delegation.

On 8 September 1929, he married Mart Leishner. After the death of his father in 1932, he became the owner of his taxi operation, which he sold in 1935. He moved to Petershagen and began working as a representative for a Berlin cheese factory. In 1939, he moved back Berlin. In 1940, he began working as a truck driver at Deutsche Post.

== Intelligence career ==
When Schulze started his career as a Soviet agent, he left the KPD and began working illegally. When World War II began, Schulze was assigned to work with the Arier espionage network that received intelligence from the German diplomat Rudolf von Scheliha. It included the resident spy in Berlin, the journalist Ilse Stöbe known as "Alta", the trade envoy Gerhard Kegel along with the couple Marta (Margarita) and lawyer Kurt Welkisch.

In 18 October 1941, technical director of a Soviet Red Army Intelligence unit in western Europe Leopold Trepper, ordered Brussels based Anatoly Gurevich to visit Berlin to see Harro Schulze-Boysen and Arvid Harnack, so as to restore the connection to Soviets. Travelling as a Simexco employee, ostensibly on a five day visit to the Leipzig Autumn Fair, he first tried to pay a visit Ilse Stöbe in Berlin but couldn't locate her. He then visited Schulze at his home in Spinolastrasse 14 in Karow to gave have him a new cipher key to be used by Ilse Stöbe for radio communications and gave him a 1000 Reichmarks for expenses. However, the cipher key was never used by Stöbe.

In November 1941, Schulze was contacted by Walter Husemann to arrange delivery of another radio transmitter for Hans Coppi. Coppi had previously been supplied with a radio transmitter but had blown the device up when he plugged the transmitter into a DC outlet to charge the batteries. Schulze had been in contact with Coppi in an attempt to repair the radio transmitter but it was too badly damaged. Schulze then delivered a second radio transmitter of the most modern type for Coppi and provided further training in its use.

== Arrest ==
On the 16 September 1942, Schulze was arrested at his workplace at the post office at the Stettin station and taken to the Gestapo House Detention Centre at Prinz-Albrecht-Straße. On the 19 December 1942, the 3rd Senate of the Reichskriegsgericht sentenced Schulze to death for "preparation for high treason, war treason, undermining military strength, aiding the enemy and espionage". On 22 December 1942 at 8:18, Schulze was hanged alongside Rudolf von Scheliha, Harro Schulze-Boysen, Arvid Harnack, John Graudenz and Kurt Schumacher in Plötzensee Prison. In January 1943, Schulze's wife Martha was sentenced to five years prison.

== Awards and honours ==
- Order of the Patriotic War, 1st class
