= Lotte Bergtel-Schleif =

German librarian who resisted against the Nazi state

Elly Lotte Bergtel-Schleif, née Schleif (born 4 July 1903 in Lichterfelde; died 26 February 1965 in East Berlin), was a German librarian who was actively involved in the resistance against Nazis while a member of the Communist Party of Germany (KPD). Bergtel-Schleif became head of the Berlin Library School after the war.

== Life ==
Lotte Schleif was the daughter of Fritz Schleif, an elementary school teacher and deputy headmaster. Her mother was Martha Bergtel. From 1909 to 1920 she attended the Lyceum and the Oberlyzeum. From 1921 to 1925 she trained as a librarian at the Central Office for Public Libraries Berlin (Zentrale für Volksbüchereien Berlin), the Berlin City Library (Stadtbibliothek Berlin-Mitte) and the Berlin State Library. In 1925, she completed her education with the exams as a librarian.

When her training was complete, she was appointed to a position as a librarian in Stralsund public library. In 1928, she moved to work in the Free Public State Library in Gera. In 1930, she moved to the Neukölln public library. Between 1933 and 1937 Bergtel-Schleif worked on a commission of the Association of German Librarians to establish binding rules for alphabetical cataloguing. From 1936 until 1942 she worked at the Nordmarkplatz library, Prenzlauer Berg and by 1937 was promoted to director. In 1939 Bergtel-Schleif achieved civil service tenure.

== Resistance ==
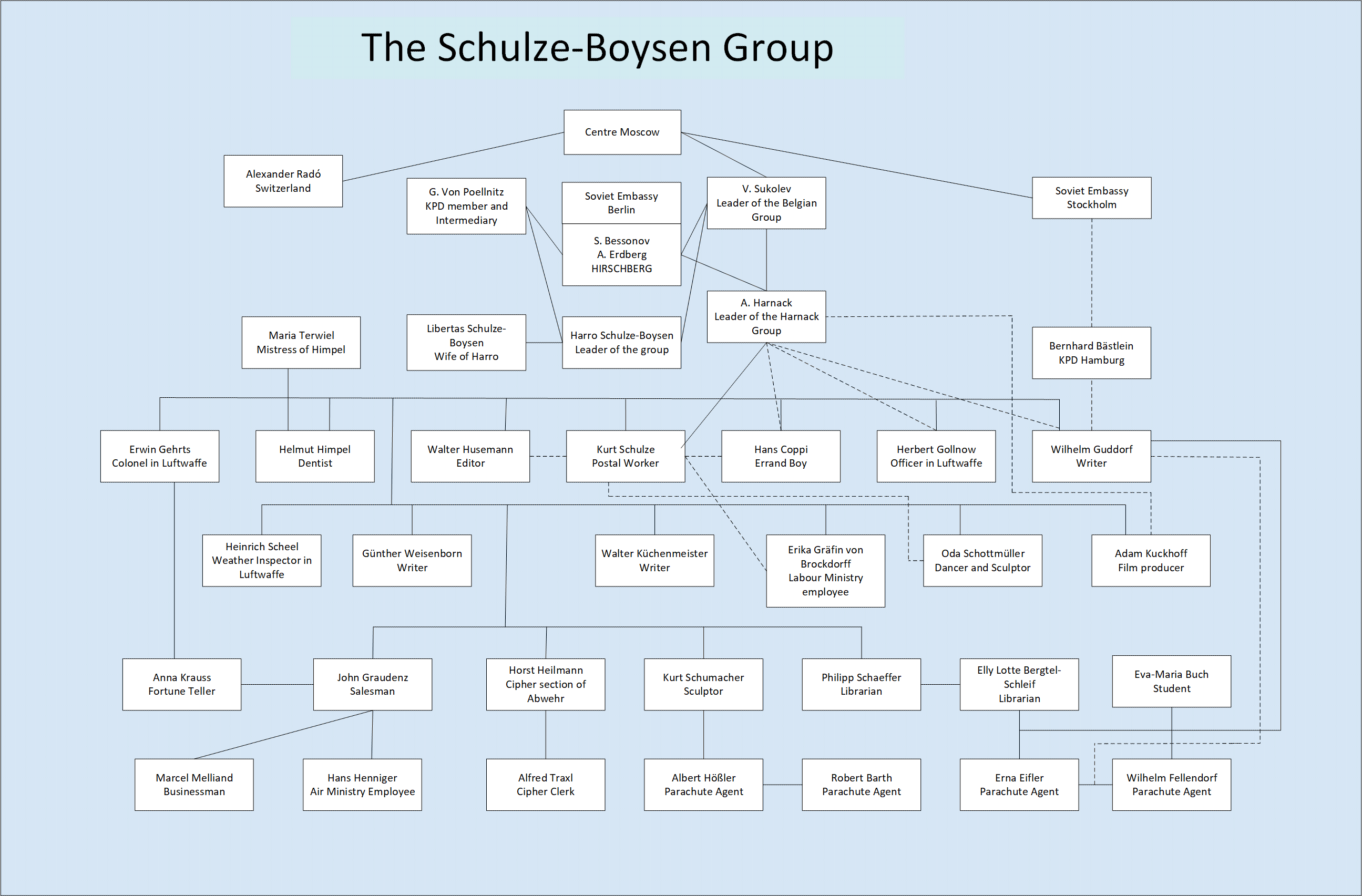
The Schulze-Boysen group in Germany

In 1930, Schleif met the librarian and sinologist Philipp Schaeffer while in a conference and the philologist Heinrich Scheel, who visited her library. Both would become important contact during the war. In spring 1933 she became a member of the KPD, through which she met John Sieg who ran a group of communists and sympathizers in Neukölln. Through Sieg she met Herbert Grasse and Otto Grabowski along with Willi Gurklies, Franz Knippenberg and Ludwig Marmulla. Through Sieg, Bergtel-Schleif was introduced to Arvid Harnack who was part of the German resistance group that would later be called the Red Orchestra by the Abwehr. Heinrich Scheel, Schulze-Boysen and Kurt Schumacher met via Schleif.

Schleif provided courier services, writing and copying services, brought persecuted people to the border with Czechoslovakia and provided the use of her home to those who were fleeing the Nazis. In the summer of 1939, she provided escape assistance by hiding Rudolf Bergtel who had escaped imprisonment from Aschendorf-Moor Prison. Schleif contacted Elisabeth Schumacher and Elfriede Paul who helped organise his escape to Switzerland. She was also part of the resistance group around Harro Schulze-Boysen and Arvid Harnack, Robert Abshagen and many others from the Communist resistance against the Nazis.

== Arrest ==
Schleif was arrested on 18 September 1942 at her workplace, the Volksbücherei Nordmarkplatz and taken to Gestapo headquarters at 8 Prinze-Albert strasse (Prince Albert street), put into protective custody by the Gestapo, interrogated and then taken the Plötzensee Prison. On 6 February 1943, she was sentenced by the Reichskammergericht to eight years in prison for "preparation for high treason". She was imprisoned in various women's prisons in Cottbus, Jauer and then in Leipzig-Kleinmeusdorf Women's Prison. There she was liberated on 19 April 1945 by American troops.

== After World War II ==
In November 1945 Schleif married German trade union official Rudolf Bergtel. In 1946 she became a member of the Socialist Unity Party of Germany. She worked at the Stadtbibliothek Neukölln from 1946 to 1947 and was commissioned in 1947 to set up the Berlin Library School, which she took over. From 1950 she was a lecturer at the Berlin School of Library. From 1955 she received a disability pension.

== Bergtel-Schleif Prize ==
In 1975, the Bergtel-Schleif Prize was created and awarded for the first time at the Humboldt University of Berlin at the Institute for Information Science. The award should be given to work that is characterized by the “creative application of Marxism-Leninism ” and that contributes to the “solution of key tasks in library and information science research”.

== The Lotte Bergtel Library ==
After the fall of the Berlin Wall, the Lotte Bergtel Library was reorganized and renamed. It is now called the Baumschulenweg district library.

== Awards and honours ==
- Patriotic Order of Merit 1956
- Medal for Fighters Against Fascism 1958

== Bibliography ==
- Ausschuss des Verbandes für Volksbibliothekare. Anweisung für den alphabetischen Katalog der Volksbüchereien: Ausgabe für große Büchereien und Büchereischulen. Unter Mitarbeit von Lotte Schleif. Leipzig: Einkaufshaus für Büchereien, 1938
- Bergtel-Schleif, Lotte. Möglichkeiten volksbibliothekarischer Arbeit unter dem Nationalsozialismus. In: Der Volksbibliothekar 1, 1947, S. 193–207. Nachdruck in: Lüdtke, Helga, [Hrsg.]., Leidenschaft und Bildung: Zur Geschichte der Frauenarbeit in Bibliotheken. Der andere Blick: Frauenstudien in Wissenschaft & Kunst, 2. Aufl., Berlin: Orlanda-Frauenverl., 1993 S. 115–132 ISBN 978-3-922166-79-5
