= Schleif =

Schleif is a surname of German origin, originating as an occupational surname for a grinder or polisher. Notable people with the surname include:

- Corine Schleif, professor and art historian
- Hans Schleif (1902–1945), German architect, archaeologist, and member of the SS
- Lotte Bergtel-Schleif (1903–1965), German librarian
- Wolfgang Schleif (1912–1984), German film director, screenwriter, and film editor

Media related to Schleif (surname) at Wikimedia Commons
