= Neutert =

Neutert (/ˈnɔɪtərt/) is a German surname and may refer to:

- Eugen Neutert (1905–1943), German resistance fighter against National Socialism
- Günther Neutert (1914–2003), German novelist, advertising manager, and publisher
- Natias Neutert (born 1941), German artist, performer, author, poet, lecturer, editor, magician, and translator
