= Robert Barth (resistance fighter) =

German communist and resistance fighter (1910–1945)

Robert Barth (born 17 April 1910 in Schöneberg, Berlin, died 23 November 1945 in Moscow) was a German communist, resistance fighter, Red Army Intelligence agent(known as a Scout in Soviet parlance) and a victim of Stalinism. He used the code name "Beck" in radio communications and the alias "Walter Kersten" in conversation.

== Life ==
As a child, Barth's parents divorced. He stayed with his mother while growing up in the Grunewaldstraße area of Schöneberg, while he attended Mittelschule. He left middle school to work as an unskilled labourer in a factory, where he had contact with the Young Communist League of Germany, which led him to accept an apprenticeship as a typesetter in the printing department of the newspaper Die Rote Fahne, the central mouthpiece of the Communist Party of Germany (KPD). After completing his apprenticeship, he worked in various printing shops and became active in the Revolutionary Trade Union Opposition. In 1929, he decided to change his political outlook and become a communist and formalised his political conversion the following year by joining the KPD. From 1932, he undertook communist agitation work in Schöneberg as part of a communist cell that included Gerhard Jurr and Erna Ohm. He was also in contact with Otto Gäbel. Barth met his wife Anna while he was in the KPD. Barth was arrested on 16 May 1933 for possessing illegal weapons and sentenced to a year in Plötzensee Prison. He was finally released on 8 May 1934, becoming unemployed. He retrained as an electrician and worked in a printing shop from 1938 until he was drafted into the Wehrmacht 168th Infantry Division in December 1939. During those years, he continued to be active in the KPD.

== Soviet agent ==
Barth was trained as a radio operator and went into active service in France in 1940. He received a wound in combat and during convalescence took a painting course at the Royal School of Art in Berlin. When he returned to active service in 1941, he was posted to the Eastern Front as a private. He was captured by Soviet forces on 2 March 1942 and transferred to a Red Army prisoner-of-war camp then moved to the Lubyanka. There he was recruited by Aleksandr Mikhaylovich Korotkov and trained by the NKVD in Bykovo (40km east of Moscow) as a parachute agent for deployment in Germany. Barth was to travel into Germany with Albert Hoessler, an NKVD agent, whose mission was to contact the resistance organisation associated with Harro Schulze-Boysen and help Hans Coppi establish radio contact with Soviet intelligence. Barth's mission was to provide assistance to Hoessler where necessary and establish a radio link with the Soviet Union to forward intelligence received from the Schulze-Boysen resistance group.

== Germany mission ==
On 5 August 1942, Barth along with Hoessler parachuted from a Soviet bomber into a location close to Gomel in south-east Belarus. The two men had identity documents, food stamps, money and wireless telegraphy sets. Barth wore the uniform of sergeant in the artillery, while Hoessler wore the uniform of corporal. After landing, they made their way to Berlin via Warsaw and Poznań, travelling as two soldiers on leave. The two men arrived in Berlin on 13 August 1942. Three days later on the 16th, Hoessler made contact with Elisabeth Schumacher. When they arrived they had difficulty finding accommodation. Initially the men were to camp in Arvid Harnack's holiday apartment at Bad Saarow but it was found to be unsuitable for radio transmission. The Schumachers introduced the couple to Harro Schulze-Boysen, who suggested a camping site close to the Teupitzer See, but it was also unsuitable. Schulze-Boysen introduced Hoessler to Hans Coppi, the group’s radio man. Eventually the men stayed with the Schumacher's.

Hoessler managed to send a radio message to the NKVD from the studio of Erika von Brockdorff at 17 Wilhelmshöher Strasse in Tempelhof, and received a reply. Barth began transmitting intelligence on 6 September 1942, sending a total of five messages and receiving a reply. (Note: Another source states the date of transmission was 27 September 1942 and only 3 messages were transmitted.)

== Arrest ==
After the period of his leave expired, Barth had to go into hiding. He spent the night in the garden house of a comrade in Brieselang as well as several other locations, including train stations. After Harro Schulze-Boysen had been arrested, Barth was arrested in Berlin on the night of 9–10 October 1942 during an ID check, possibly because he had been registered as a deserter. Hoessler was arrested several weeks before on 16 September 1942. The Wehrmacht handed Barth over to the Gestapo. During interrogation, he gave the Gestapo his radio key and his code name “Beck” and reported on his training in the Soviet Union and his mission.

== Funkspiel ==
After Barth was arrested he was forced to take part in a funkspiel (Note: Funkspiel, defined by the German name Funk meaning radio and spiel meaning play or performance, was a common counterintelligence technique where controlled information was transmitted over a captured agent's radio, where the agent's parent service had no knowledge that the agent had turned. It was undertaken for a number of reasons that included poisoning the source by conveying deceptive material, discovering important intelligence and identifying networks.) operation by the Gestapo officer Heinz Pannwitz of the Sonderkommando Rote Kapelle, which was assigned the codename "Amateur". On 14 October 1942, Barth set his first message during the funkspiel operation and tried to warn Soviet intelligence but failed to convey the precariousness of his situation, which resulted in Soviet intelligence forwarding operational details of other agents in Germany. Amongst those who were exposed was Hansheinrich Kummerow, who was arrested on 30 November 1942 and executed on 4 February 1944. On 15 October 1942, Hoessler attempted to send a warning message in his funkspiel messages but he was unsuccessful in warning Soviet intelligence. Between 4 December and 11 December 1942, the Sonderkommando received messages through Barth's funkspiel that exposed SS-Hauptsturmführer Wilhelm Lehmann, a Gestapo official who had been an NKVD spy for the Soviet Union from 1929. He was shot without trial that month.

On 26 February 1944, Barth was transferred to the Drögen Security Police School near Fürstenberg/Havel, where he continued the funkspiel. On 12 April 1944, the Soviet NKVD ceased communicating with Barth. With no further use to the Sonderkommando, Barth was sent to Ravensbrück concentration camp where he remained there until October 1944.

== Western Front ==
On the 1 October 1944, Barth was released from prison to work as a V-Mann, short for Vertrauens-mann for the Gestapo. (German:V-Mann, plural V-Leute). They were generally prisoners who agreed to work as undercover agents on pain of death, should they have refused. (Note: The German tradition of Sippenhaft would have meant that Barth's wife Anna was also arrested and held in Gestopo protective custody. Barth was arrested at his sick wife's bedside in hospital.) He was trained by the Sonderkommando for a mission to conduct reconnaissance behind the American military lines on the Western Front using the identity of Robert Brauer. He was released in October 1944 and worked as an electrician in Saarbrücken for 6 months. On 20 March 1945, the US 70th Infantry Division entered Saarbrücken, leaving Barth in Allied territory. On 23 March, he confessed to being a Soviet scout and made a request to return to the Soviet Union.

== Arrest ==
Upon his arrival in Moscow, Barth was arrested and taken to Lubyanka Prison, later imprisoned in Lefortovo Prison. On 21 November 1945, he was sentenced to death as a suspected traitor for "espionage" and for failing to fulfill the duties of the NKVD. Two days later, he was executed in Moscow.
