= Die Innere Front =

Series of clandestine communist leaflets in WWII Germany

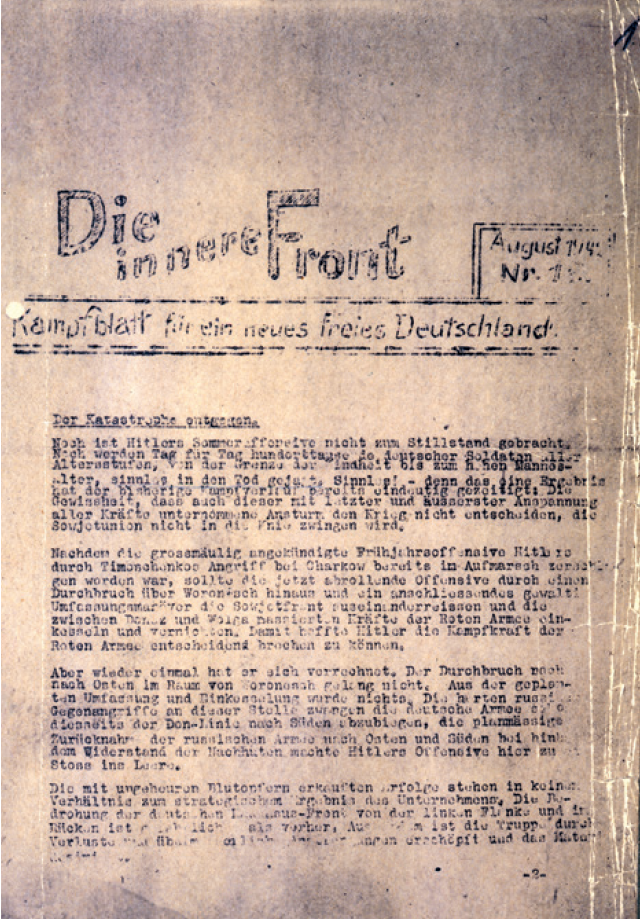
A copy of "Die Innere Front" No. 12 from August 1943. The article describes the catastrophic defeat of German forces and the capture of Kharkov after the Belgorod–Kharkov offensive operation in August 1943

Die Innere Front (The Home Front) was a series of clandestine and illegal leaflets written and distributed by a group of communist resistance fighters from the Neukölln area of Berlin that were associated with the Red Orchestra ("Rote Kapelle") during World War II. The leaflet was produced twice-weekly on a hectograph machine and translated in five languages, with each version having the byline "Militant paper for a new free Germany". Communist Party of Germany (KPD) members that included the American journalist John Sieg along with the German printer Herbert Grasse, established the production of the leaflet from December 1941 onwards. It is considered the main organ of the Red Orchestra as many of them contributed to it.

== Publication ==
John Sieg and Herbert Grasse were members of the Neukölln Communist Party of Germany (KPD) and were experienced in printing and distributing leaflets, having previously released several different ones in the lead up to 1941 including 21 Seiten and Der Vortrupp. Sieg worked with Harro Schulze-Boysen on the Der Vortrupp (Frontlines) with Schulze-Boysen providing the articles. While many people who were part of the resistance group associated with Schulze-Boysen and Harnack wrote articles for the Die Innere Front , it was strictly a communist party organ and followed Soviet propaganda to the letter.

In 1939, the journalist and KPD member Wilhelm Guddorf was released from prison and became reacquainted with his friends from the Communist Party of Germany (KPD) resistance, John Sieg and Walter Husemann, after he had been released from Sachsenhausen concentration camp. After the German invasion of the Soviet Union in June 1941, Guddorf wrote an analysis of the political situation as it related to the invasion, for the KPD. It was decided by Sieg, Grasse and Otto Grabowski (1892–1961) that Guddorf's report should be publicised and this initiated the production of the leaflet.

According to Heinrich Scheel, the name of the magazine was programmatic i.e.designed in such a way as to follow a plan, representing "a whole program and said that the Liberation Front of the Peoples went right through the middle of Germany and German patriotism fought exclusively on this front against the Nazi regime"

The leaflet was specifically addressed to the German workers and foreign forced labourers and was translated into five languages.

Like any kind of newspaper, the leaflet sought to offer different kinds of information for their readers. Many articles were polemics against the war and called for outright resistance if not strikes along with sabotage aligned with a belief that the only way Europe could be saved from total destruction was for Germany to end the war. Factual information that was strictly illegal was published, for example, the frequencies of Soviet radio stations. Attack articles were created that exposed industries for profiteering, for example, IG Farben and exposed the appalling conditions of the forced labour works. Pertinent economic information was published, presumably provided by people like Arvid Harnack who worked at the Reich Ministry of Economics (Reichswirtschaftsministerium).

== Production ==
Once an article was written it was typed up by Charlotte Bischoff, translation of articles into French were done by Eva-Maria Buch and into Polish by Sophie Sieg and into Russian by Wilhelm Guddorf. Photography work for the leaflet was undertaken by Elisabeth Schumacher. The wax matrices were written up by Vera Wulff and Ernest Hartwig duplicated the articles as needed.

Around 20 issues were published in two years with around 600 copies circulated every month.

To produce the leaflet, the group had to find both the means to produce it and a place to produce it. Eugen Neutert managed to procure both a typewriter and the wax matrices that were to be used by the hectograph process for printing. Grass procured both the hectograph printing press and the paper rolls needed for printing on. Walter Bremer (1904–1995) who was student, joined the publishing team and supplied both paper and wax matrices.

The first publications of the leaflet were created in the summer house in the garden of Otto Grabowski house. The publishing was eventually moved to a paint and varnish store owned by Otto Grabowski's brother, in Rudow, Max Grabowski and run by his wife Trude Grabowski. As Grabowski was a freelancer, available to work everyday for payment, much of the work of printing fell to him. Once a production run was completed, Grabowski would take the leaflets in a suitcase and pass them onto the group that was responsible for distribution. For security purposes, the production team never knew the names of those who were distributing the leaflets.

== Remaining copy ==
Only a single full copy of the "Die Innere Front" remains, which is number 15 from August 1942.
