= Andrea Amort =

Austrian author and historian (born 1958)

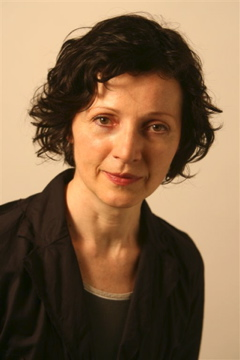
Andrea Amort

Andrea Amort (born 1958, Linz) is an Austrian dance critic, dance historian, playwright, festival and exhibition curator as well as a non-fiction writer.

== Life ==
Andrea Amort studied modern dance and classical ballet with Erika Gangl and Andrei Jerschik in Linz, and Theatre Studies at the University of Vienna, where she received her doctorate in 1982 with a thesis on the story of the ballet of the Vienna State Opera from 1918 to 1942.

From 1981 to 2009, she was a dance critic and sometimes also an editor and deputy director of the cultural department of Vienna's Daily Kurier. Presently she writes for international media and trade magazines.

After teaching at the Anton Bruckner Private University for Music, Drama, and Dance, she moved in 2003 to the Music and Arts University of the City of Vienna. She has lectured in London, Oxford and Paris and teaches at the University of Zurich, as well as working on documentary films.

From 2009, she has worked as a curator for theatre, dance and performance on behalf of Vienna, where she currently lives.

== Artistic director of performance projects and festivals ==
- Viennese dance in exile: Lecture and Performance Series in cooperation, inter alia, with the Kunstverein Alte Schmiede and the Jewish Museum in Vienna since 1998, with the focus on biographies and work of dancers and choreographers Hanna Berger, Gertrud Bodenwieser, Magda Brunner-Hoyos, Hilde Holger, Gertrud Kraus, Stella Mann, Hedi Pope, Cilli Wang, Wera Goldman and Shona Dunlop MacTavish.
- Dance in exile: exhibition at the Austrian Theatre Museum, lecture series and dance program in collaboration with the Festival tanz2000.at & ImPulsTanz in Viennese Akademietheater, with works by Hanna Berger, Gertrud Bodenwieser, Andrei Jerschik, and Pola Nirenska.
- Hanna Berger: Retouchings. Scenic Project with works by Nikolaus Adler, Manfred Aichinger, Bernd Roger Bienert, Rose Breuss and Willi Dorner (Festspielhaus, St. Pölten, 2006), Theatre Odeon, Vienna 2008, Posthof Line (2009), ImPulsTanz Festival (2010).
- Beyond the Waltz Festival, co-curated by George Jackson, in cooperation with the Austrian Cultural Forum in Washington (2006).
- Touches Festival. Dance before 1938-, Dance today. 33 Events. Theatre Odeon and other places, Vienna (2008).

== Publications ==
=== Books ===
- Andrea Amort (2001). Mimi Wunderer-Gosch (ed.). Österreich tanzt. Geschichte und Gegenwart (in German). Wien: Böhlau. ISBN 3-205-99226-1.
- —— (2003). Nurejew und Wien. Ein leidenschaftliches Verhältnis (in German). Wien: Brandstätter. ISBN 3-85498-227-5.
- —— (2010). Hanna Berger. Spuren einer Tänzerin im Widerstand : Hrsg. vom Deutschen Tanzarchiv Köln (in German). Wien: Brandstätter. ISBN 978-3-85033-188-3.

=== Posts (selection) ===
- Andrea Amort (October 2006), "Wiener Tanz im Exil. Plädoyer für die Einrichtung eines Tanzarchivs", Das Jüdische Echo. Europäisches Forum für Kultur und Politik (in German), no. 55, pp. 182–187
- —— (2007), Michael Buhrs (ed.), "Ich könnte mir eine moderne Tänzerin denken, die auf Krücken tanzt. Anmerkungen zum Paradigmenwechsel im künstlerischen Tanz am Beispiel des Tanzprogramms im Wiener Theater und Kabarett Fledermaus von 1907 bis 1913", Fledermaus-Kabarett: 1907 bis 1913. Ein Gesamtkunstwerk der Wiener Werkstätte. Literatur, Musik, Tanz (in German), Wien: Brandstätter, pp. 137–153
- —— (July–September 2007), "Aus der Gegenwart kann man sich nicht davonstehlen. Aspekte einer Standortbestimmung des freien künstlerischen Tanzes in Wien", Gift. Zeitschrift für freies Theater (in German), pp. 38–42
- —— (2007), Christian Dewald (ed.), "Die tanzende Straße. Zum "Festzug der Gewerbe" von Rudolf Laban 1929 in Wien", Arbeiterkino. Linke Filmkultur der Ersten Republik (in German), Wien, pp. 53–65
- —— (2009), Claudia Jeschke; Nicole Haitzinger (eds.), "Stampfen, Wirbeln, wildes Trommeln. Zur Rezeption der Ballets Russes in Wien – Stationen von 1909–1933", Schwäne und Feuervögel. Die Ballets Russes 1909–1929. Bildwelten in Bewegung (in German), Henschel, pp. 140–151
- —— (2009), Gabriele Brandstetter; Gunhild Oberzaucher-Schüller (eds.), "Annäherung an die (Bühnen-)Glückseligkeit der Grete Wiesenthal anlässlich der Neueinstudierung originaler Tänze in Wien 2007/08", Mundart der Wiener Moderne: Der Tanz der Grete Wiesenthal (in German), Kieser, pp. 263–273
- —— (2009), "Free Dance in Interwar Vienna", in Deborah Holmes; Lisa Silverman (eds.), Interwar Vienna. Culture Between Tradition and Modernity (in German), New York: Camden House, pp. 117–142, ISBN 978-1-57113-420-2
- —— (2010), Wolfgang Kos (ed.), "An der Wende. Zur Situation des künstlerischen Tanzes in Wien um 1930", Kampf um die Stadt. Politik, Kunst und Alltag um 1930 (in German), Wien, pp. 259–263
- —— (October 2010), "Selbstverantwortliche Tänzer, kreativ nutzbare Archive" (PDF), Kontra. Das Magazin des Konservatorium Wien Privatuniversität (in German), no. 21, p. 17
- —— (2013), Monika Faber; Magdalena Vukovic (eds.), "Ausdruck und Verführung. Tilly Losch und Hedy Pfundmayr. Zwei Ballettstars aus Wien im Sog der Moderne", Tanz der Hände. Tilly Losch und Hedy Pfundmayr in Fotografien (1920 bis 1935) (in German), Wien: New Academic Press, pp. 27–42 ISBN 978-3-7003-1896-5
- Auch Richard Strauss wollte den Tanz erneuern. Wie Choreograf Heinrich Kröller die Josephs Legende ab 1921 in Mitteleuropa durchsetzte. In: Worte klingen, Töne sprechen. Richard Strauss und die Oper. Hg. v. Christiane Mühlegger-Henhapel u. Alexandra Steiner-Strauss. Symposium anlässlich der Richard Strauss-Ausstellung im Theatermuseum Wien, 22.–23. Jänner 2015. Wien, Holzhausen, 2015, S. 125–137, ISBN 978-3-902976-55-0
- Das Tanz-Theater der Anita Berber. Der Körper als Fratze. In: gift. zeitschrift für freies theater, Wien, 01/2015, S. 16–19. ISSN 1992-2973
