= Huseman =

Huseman is a surname. Notable people with the surname include:

- Dan Huseman (born 1952), American politician
- Rick Huseman (1973–2011), American racing driver
- Richard A. Huseman (born 1946), American Physician, Nephrologist

== See also ==
- Husemann
