= Herbert Grasse =

German resistance fighter and publisher

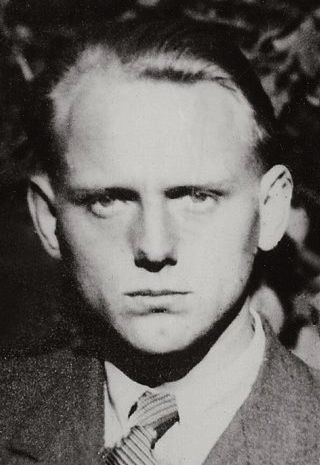
Herbert Grasse

Herbert Grasse (9 October 1910 in Berlin; 24 October 1942) was a German communist, resistance fighter and anti-Nazi. Grasse was particularly active in the Communist Party of Germany (KPD) as the leader of a KPD sub-section in Neukölln that was largely made up of people who supported the Social Democratic Party of Germany. Grasse, who was a trained printer who produced two communist newspapers. In 1933, he became an editor and distributor of Neuköllner Sturmfahne. In June 1941, he founded and became a publisher and editor of the Die Innere Front along with John Sieg and Otto Grabowski. The Die Innere Front became the main organ of the Red Orchestra (Rote Kapelle). Grasse' resistance cell was exposed by Gestapo spy, Willi Bredow. When he was arrested, he committed suicide on the way to interrogation.

== Life ==
When Grasse left school he completed an apprenticeship as a printer. As a young man he was radicalised and became a communist, first joining the Young Communist League of Germany and then later the Communist Party of Germany (KPD).

== Neuköllner Sturmfahne ==
In 1933, Grasse along with the KPD functionary Alfred Schaefer, who worked in Agitprop, became involved in the production of the communist Neuköllner Sturmfahne. The paper had been published sporadically since 1932 by KPD functionaries Reinhold Sasse, Fritz Plumboom and Walter Klauss as well as Fritz Grünberg, who was followed by Otto Grabowski but successive arrests by the Gestapo had led to the publishing team in the Neukölln area rapidly changing. Grasse and Schaefer were supported by machine fitter Alfred Perl.

In June 1934, the leadership of the KPD leadership in Neukölln was penetrated by the Gestapo spy, Willi Bredow, who acted as courier for the group. Bredo compiled reports on the Neukölln group, under the codename "Ho3" that he would deliver to the Gestapo office in Berlin. Grasse was betrayed by Bredow but remain at large while he was observed by the Gestapo until finally on 23 July 1936, he was arrested. During his interrogation, he never mentioned his connection to Alfred Schaefer. He was sentenced to two and half years in prison and released in 1939. In January 1936 Grasse was released and remade his contacts with the Neukölln communists. He was introduced to the resistance group around Wilhelm Schürmann-Horster where he would eventually meet Hans Coppi and John Sieg.

== Die Innere Front ==
After the German invasion of the Soviet Union in June 1941, KPD member Wilhelm Guddorf wrote an analysis of the political situation as it related to the invasion, for the KPD. In December 1941 it was decided by John Sieg, Grasse and Otto Grabowski (1892–1961) that Guddorf's report should be publicised and this initiated the production of the Die Innere Front. Grasse procured both the hectograph printing press and the paper rolls needed for printing on. Grasse was the main publisher of the leaflet along with Grabowski, Sieg and Adam Kuckhoff. To distribute the paper, Grasse along with Eugen Neutert, Karl Böhme, John Sieg and Hans Coppi contacted and established resistance cells in various German armaments factories including the AEG transformer factory, the German Weapons and Ammunition Factories, Knorr-Bremse, and Hasse & Wrede.

== Arrest ==
In October 1942, Grasse was arrested by the Gestapo for a second time. He realised that as he had a political conviction he wouldn't be released so committed suicide on the way to the interrogation.
