= Wilhelm Schürmann-Horster =

German actor and resistance fighter (1900–1943)

Willy Schürmann-Horster
- Schürmann-Horster with his characteristic artists hair
- Born: 21 June 1900; Cologne
- Died: 9 September 1943 (aged 43); Plötzensee Prison, Berlin
- Education: Düsseldorf Drama School (Schauspielschule Düsseldorf)
- Occupations: Actor, dramaturge, director
- Years active: 1918–1943
- Known for: Member of the Red Orchestra ("Rote Kapelle")

Wilhelm "Willy" Schürmann-Horster (21 June 1900 – 9 September 1943) was a German actor, dramaturge, and director, who was a marxist and dedicated communist, and who became a resistance fighter against the Nazis. As a young man, Schürmann-Horster trained as an actor at the Düsseldorf Drama School. During the 1920s he worked in various acting troupes in theatres in the Rhineland. By the mid 1930s, he had become a communist and in 1934 and 1935 he was arrested for political agitation but acquitted for lack of evidence. After moving to Berlin in 1937, he met and became friends with Cay and Erika von Brockdorff. Through them, a discussion group of like-minded friends was formed who openly discussed current affairs and Schürmann-Horster became their spokesman. Through contacts in the group, connections were made with a resistance organisations that was run by Harro Schulze-Boysen and Arvid Harnack in 1940. Although Schürmann-Horster wasn't a physical resistance fighter in the cast of Harro Schulze-Boysen, he was an intellectual opponent of the Nazis who displayed his convictions on the stage and as a result never took part in any of the operations that his friends undertook. After falling ill in 1941, Schürmann-Horster moved to Konstanz where he worked as a dramaturge at the Grenzland Theatre. In October 1942, he was arrested and sentenced to death for "high treason", "dissemination of illegal writings" and "aiding and abetting the enemy" by the 2nd senate of the Volksgerichtshof. He was executed in Plötzensee Prison on 9 September 1943. He was described by his close friend, the communist trade unionist Rudy Goguel in the daily newspaper Südkurier as

Willy, tall, skinny, a little cross-eyed, with an idiosyncratic artist's mane, was the typical stage man – always witty, often critical and always full of energy.

== Life ==
On 2 November 1928, Schürmann-Horster married the actor Hedda, née Lindner-Leuschner. In October 1940, Schürmann-Horster married his second wife, Klara Harprath who was an elementary school teacher. Schürmann-Horster had known Harprath from the Rhineland theatre scene since 1923. In April 1941, the couple had a son.

== Career ==
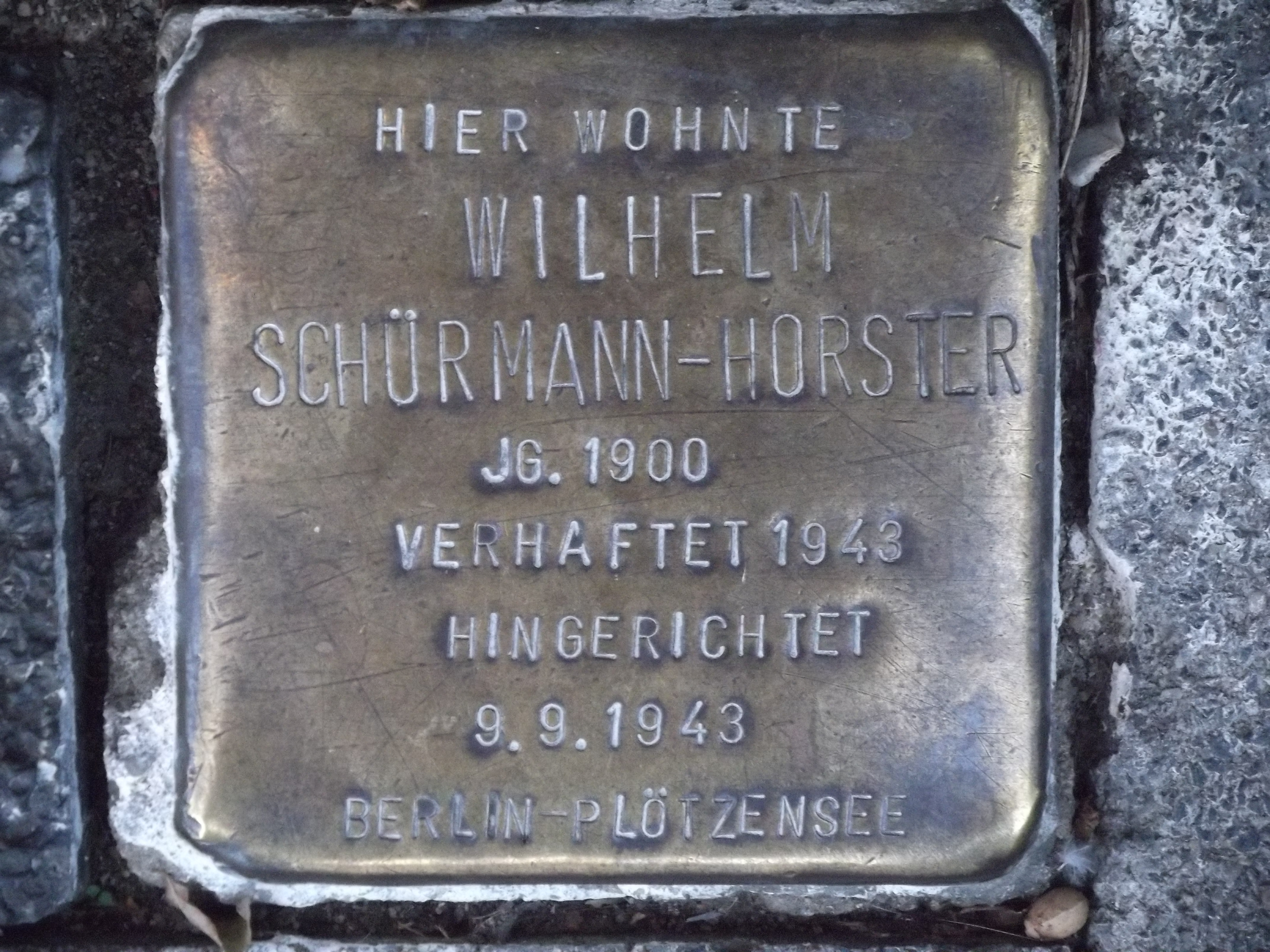
A Stolperstein or "stumbling block" placed at 41 Schwerinstraße in Düsseldorf to honour Schürmann-Horster. A second Stolperstein has been placed outside the Stadttheater in Konstanz

After his school education, Schürmann-Horster became interested in acting. In 1918, he started studying at the Düsseldorf Drama School (Schauspielschule Düsseldorf, a private drama school that was attached to the Düsseldorfer Schauspielhaus) under German actor and theatre director Louise Dumont. After leaving Düsseldorf in 1920, he staged and acted in political theatre in Rhineland. At the time, he worked with the Russian writer Maxim Gorky, the German playwrights Ernst Toller and Bertolt Brecht and the German dramatist Georg Kaiser, amongst others. From 1920 to 1922, Wilhelm Schürmann-Horster worked as a lecturer at adult education colleges in Remscheid and Essen in an acting troupe known as "Young Activists' League". It was during this period that he began to publish articles in prominent cultural and political journals. In 1923, he became a member of Communist Party of Germany, however, according to the transcripts of the 1934 trial, he was excluded due to political differences. On 28 September 1924, he formed an acting troupe known as "Junge Aktion" ("Young Action"). From 1926 to 1928, Schürmann-Horster worked in an acting engagement at the Schauspielhaus Bad Godesberg with an acting troupe that was known as "Notgemeinschaft Düsseldorfer Schauspieler" (Düsseldorf Actors' Difficulty Community) that included many members of his previous company. In 1929, he became a dedicated promoter of political propaganda (agit-prop, political theatre) with a troupe known as "Truppe im Westen" that performed the plays of the German doctor and playwright Friedrich Wolf. The plays were particularly successful, enabling the actors to continue in work until 1932. The actors staged the plays in local bars and factories, believing they should be played where people lived and worked. Around 1933, he was appointed to the role of director for a short time at the Düsseldorf cabaret "Klimperkasten" until the Nazi seizure of power led to the theatre being closed down by the police. He continued working in theatre engagements in Bad Godesberg until 1935.

On 27 September 1934, Schürmann-Horster along with his partner Harald Quedenfeldt and the trade unionist Rudy Goguel were arrested by the Gestapo. Schürmann-Horster had known Quedenfeldt, a stage designer and later theatre director since 1919 and had become partners in 1923. Quedenfeldt's parents Erwin and Emma Quedenfeldt had taken Schürmann-Horster in as a foster child. At that time, their house at 41 Schwerinstraße in Düsseldorf-Golzheim, had been used to hold meetings for the local opposition to the Nazis. The indictment to prove the charge of "High Treason" could not be proven and they were both released two days later on 29 September. On 23 January 1935, Schürmann-Horster was again arrested and indicted for "High Treason". As no evidence could be found, he was once more cleared by the Düsseldorf court, however, both himself and Quedenfeldt were placed under constant surveillance by the Gestapo. During the spring of 1935, Schürmann-Horster along with 70 other communists were arrested and charged at the Higher Regional Court in Hamm but was once again acquitted.

From 1937 onwards, Schürmann-Horster lived in Berlin, at the time mostly unemployed, occasionally working as a freelancer in the German film industry. He wrote a screenplay "Till Eulenspiegel" and dealt with questions of theatre theory and the German classics.

== Resistance ==
In 1938, Schürmann-Horster met the sculptor Cay von Brockdorff and his wife Erika von Brockdorff at a costume party at the Academy of Fine Arts in Berlin. The acquaintance developed into discussion group soon afterwards. In 1938, several other people with similar artistic interests and ideological significance joined the group. Through Cay von Brockdorff, who studied sculpture with Wilhelm Gerstel at the Berlin Arts Academy, Schürmann-Horster met the student sculptor Ruthild Hahne who became part of the group At the same time Hanna Berger became part of the group whose early meetings were held in Hahne's apartment in Nachodstraße in Wilmersdorf, where art, freedom, love, current political events, the development of the Nazi state and what it meant for them and their future were discussed. In 1938, the group met the married couple Jutta and Viktor Dubinsky through Cay von Brockdorff. The couple were students and committed communists as members of the KPD. Also in 1938, Friedrich Schauer, an architect who knew Erika von Brockdorff began to attends meetings. Schauer along with Walter Hoffmann and Willi Sänger were already working in a resistance cell and were looking for like-minded contacts. In January 1939, Herbert Grasse who was a printer joined the group. Later in 1939, the commercial clerk and KPD member, Karl Böhme became part of the group. Also in 1939, Coppi was introduced to Schürmann-Horster through a friend from the banned KJVD, and joined their discussions.

In 1940, the group came into contact with Harro Schulze-Boysen and Arvid Harnack via through Coppi's friend Heinrich Scheel, who knew Schulze-Boysen personally. Schulze-Boysen had been collaborating with Harnack in what was then a resistance group that would be reformulated into espionage organisation that began in September 1940, that sent German intelligence to the Soviet Union. It is unknown whether Schürmann-Horster knew Harro Shulze-Boysen or Arvid Harnack personally. Certainly the surviving documentation on the political, and social aspects of the theatre and for example the philosophical implications of artistic representation, created as part of Schürmann-Horster's commitment to his profession, don't show that he was involved in leafletting or in contact with Soviet intelligence or indeed conducting espionage. Instead, during that period he worked on editing Goethe's play Egmont and Schiller's play Don Carlos for the theatre publisher Die Wende, in a manner that attacked the cultural policy of the Nazis. In October or November 1940, the group decided to take a more robust approach to resistance instead of being a talking-shop. Schürmann-Horster selected three people using the same organisational structure as the KPD. One would be a political leader, one would be an organisational leader and one would be selected to be agitation propaganda leader. However, within two weeks it was decided by the group that was far too dangerous a task and the whole exercise was abandoned. In 1941, Hahne's husband Wolfgang Thiess became part in the discussions. Already an active resistor, he had thrown leaflets from a train Hans Coppi knew the electrician Eugen Neutert and he became part of the secret group, in the autumn of 1941.

== Konstanz ==
From early-1941, Schürmann-Horster was ill and lived outside Berlin, and he failed to attend any of the regular meetings that were being held by the group. He tried to find work in the regions, not as an actor but as a director of classical plays. At the same time, he sent his new theatre briefs to the Reich authorities that controlled the theatre, for example, the Amt Rosenberg office and the Reichstheaterkammer, a department of the Reich Chamber of Culture for approval. (Note: At the time the Nazi Reich Chamber of Culture had complete control of all German creative industry and decided what could be shown and what couldn't) In the briefs, he criticized the use of pathos, the idealisation of the heroic and exaggeration of the abysmal in the performances of the classics. He offered to form a new experimental acting troupe that would re-examine the classics. However, his ideas were rejected.

In the autumn of 1941 Schürmann-Horster moved to Konstanz. In November 1941, he gained employment as the director and dramaturge (dramatic adviser, essentially head of propaganda) at the Grenzland Theatre (Note: A Nazi term for a newly constructed theatre that was built within the border of the German Empire of 31 December 1937) in Bodensee, Konstanz on Lake Constance for the 1942-1942 season. His friend Wolfgang Müller has recommended Schürmann-Horster to the artistic director of the Grenzland Theatre, Fritz Becker. At the time the theatre was going to be closed as most staff had left due to conscription, including the previous artistic director. However, due to its closeness to Switzerland, and planned use by the Nazis, it was ordered to stay open. He was responsible for examining incoming plays to determine if they were culturally suitable, submitting programme proposals and advertising the plays using press-releases as well as designing booklets and guiding guest performances. During his time in Konstanz, he never worked as an actor. Between October 1941 and May 1942 there were 247 performances that were made up of 84 operettas, 59 operas, 53 comedies and 51 plays.

On 15 March 1942, Schürmann-Horster wrote an article for the Bodensee Rundschau, a daily newspaper in Constance. In the article, Schürmann-Horster criticised the performances of the German classics, Wallenstein, stating that instead of fateful tragedy, they should be performed with a focus on human consciousness and the problems of human society. This brought him into conflict with the leisure organisation Strength Through Joy (KdF) organisation, who accused him of promulgating "Berlin-Jewish Business Practices" ("Berliner-jüdisches Geschäftsgebaren"). The KdF accused him of being mediocre and only offering "worn-out" plays that had already been performed 25 times or more. (Note: With insufficient male actors available to maintain a variety, the same actors played multiple parts across plays) Fritz Becker, the director supported him and arranged a salary increase to show his support. In June 1942, an agreement was reached with the KdF on the number of ticket sales that would be expected and the setting of plays. In order to protect the male actors from being convened, Schürmann-Horster successfully organized an additional summer season in 1942 after the end of the theatre season.

== Arrest ==
On 29 October 1942, Schürmann-Horster was arrested while the theatre ship was returning from a performance in Überlingen, Konstanz and was transported to Berlin. To the end, Schürmann-Horster was sure he would avoid conviction. His theatre director Fritz Becker, travelled to Berlin to appear in support of Schürmann-Horster, but to no avail.

The second senate of the People's Court in case number "10 J 13/43g" on 20–21 August 1943 sentenced Schürmann-Horster, Neutert and Thiess to death. Schauer, Bölter and Dubinsky were sentenced to eight years in prison. Schmidt and Hahne were sentenced to four years in prison while Hempel received two years, Hoffman to one year in prison and Hanna Berger was acquitted. Schürmann-Horster was executed by hanging on 9 September 1943 in Plötzensee Prison at the same time as Neutert and Thiess.
