= Marta Husemann =

German actress (1913–1960)

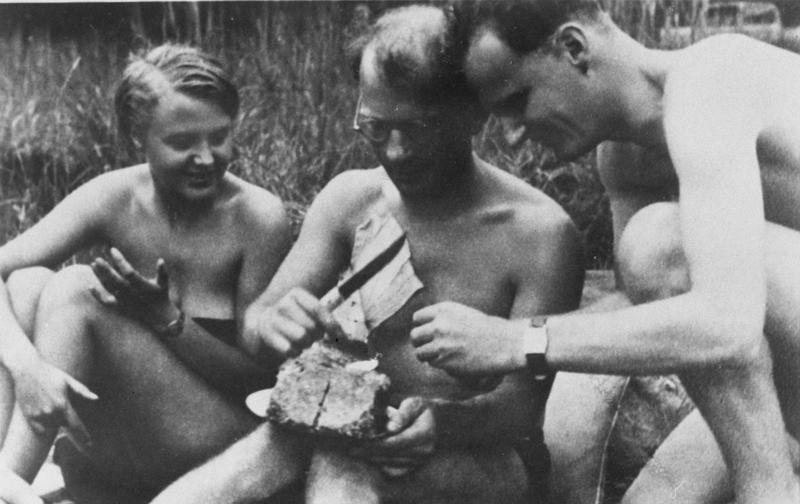
- Marta Husemann (left) with Harro Schulze-Boysen (right) and Günther Weisenborn
- Born: Marta Wolter; 20 August 1913; Berlin, German Empire
- Died: 30 June 1960 (aged 46); East Germany
- Other name: Marta Jendretzky
- Occupations: Actress, activist
- Known for: Red Orchestra
- Political party: KPD
- Movement: Communism
- Spouse: Hans Jendretzky

Marta Husemann (née Wolter, later Jendretzky; 20 August 1913 – 30 June 1960) was a German actress and anti-Nazi Resistance fighter in the Red Orchestra.

== Life ==
Husemann trained as a tailor and entered the KJVD in 1928, aged 15. In 1931, she was a member of the KPD. In the classic film Kuhle Wampe of Slatan Dudow she played "Gerda", one of the two female leads. The experience she had as an actress progressed in 1935 with her screenplay for the short feature film Fünf Personen suchen Anschluß" (Five People Seeking Connection). The film was shot under the direction of Jürgen von Alten in the Berlin department store KaDeWe.

In the same year she was interrogated for the first time by the Gestapo. In November 1936, she was arrested and the following March to June 1937 detained at the Moringen concentration camp in Vorbeugehäftling - euphemistically known as protective custody. She was released, after being seen by Heinrich Himmler who thought she looked too Aryan.

Together with her husband Walter Husemann, she was then active in the anti-fascist Red Orchestra of Harro Schulze-Boysen. Often the group met unobserved by the Gestapo at Schloss Liebenberg. She had particularly intensive contacts with Gerhard and Gerda Sredzki, who participated actively in the Saefkow-Jacob-Bästlein Organization of the resistance against Nazism.

On 19 September 1942, she was arrested again and sentenced to four years in prison in January 1943 by the Reichskriegsgericht. In 1945, she was freed from the women's penitentiary in Leipzig by the Red Army.

After the war, she worked in the Communist Party of Germany (KPD) district headquarters in East Berlin. After her remarriage, to Hans Jendretzky, she took the name Marta Jendretzky.

== Sources ==
- Christl Wickert: Frauen gegen die Diktatur – Widerstand und Verfolgung im nationalsozialistischen Deutschland. Schriften der Gedenkstätte Deutscher Widerstand: Berlin 1995.
- Silke Kettelhake: „Erzähl allen, allen von mir!“ Das schöne kurze Leben der Libertas Schulze-Boysen - 1913-194. Droemer-Knauer, München 2008 ISBN 978-3-426-27437-8.
- Elfriede Paul: Ein Sprechzimmer der Roten Kapelle. Berlin 1981.
- Gert Rosiejka: Die Rote Kapelle. „Landesverrat“ als antifaschistischer Widerstand. ergebnisse-Verlag, Hamburg 1986, ISBN 978-3-925622-16-8.
