= Walter Husemann =

German communist and Red Orchestra resistance member (1909–1943)

- Walter Husemann
- Born: 2 December 1909; Ellerbek, German Empire
- Died: 13 May 1943 (aged 33); Plötzensee Prison, Berlin, Nazi Germany
- Cause of death: Guillotined
- Occupations: Toolmaker, later Journalist
- Known for: Anti-fascist, Red Orchestra resistance member
- Political party: KPD
- Movement: Communism
- Spouse: Marta Husemann

Walter Husemann (2 December 1909 – 13 May 1943) was a German communist and resistance fighter against the Nazi regime. As a young man, Husemann trained an industrial toolmaker, before training as a journalist. He became interested in politics and joined the Communist Party of Germany (KPD). With the arrival of the Nazis in 1933, he became a resistance fighter and through his wife, the actor Marta Husemann, he became associated with an anti-fascist resistance group around Harro Schulze-Boysen and Arvid Harnack that was later called the Red Orchestra by the Gestapo. Along with John Sieg whom he met in the KPD and Fritz Lange, Martin Weise and Herbert Grasse he wrote and published the resistance magazine, The Home Front Die Innere Front.

== Life ==
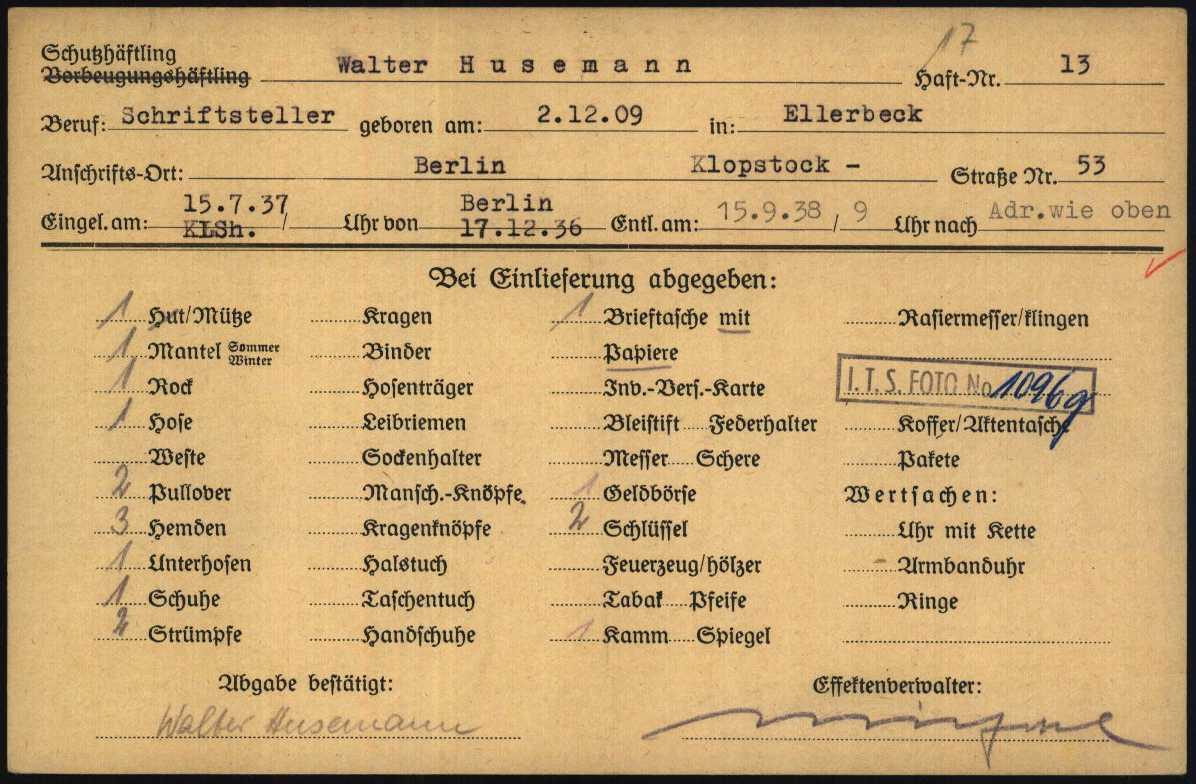
Effects card (list of property) of Walter Husemann as a prisoner in the Nazi concentration camp Buchenwald.

Husemann was born to Wilhelm and Luise Husemann. After training as a lathe operator, in an apprenticeship, he organised a strike for better wages and was dismissed. In 1924, Husemann became a member of the Young Communist League of Germany and in 1929 became director of the Anti-Fascist Young Guards, the youth organisation of the Kampfbund gegen den Faschismus (Combat League Against Fascism), in the randenburg area. In 1930, Husemann met Marta Wolter, a KPD member and actor who had been in Günther Weisenborn's and Bertolt Brecht's play, The Mother and Brechts Kuhle Wampe. In 1932, the couple moved in together an apartment in Mannheim. From 1930 to 1933, he worked as a trainee editor for several communist newspapers including the Die Rote Fahne, the Ruhr-Echo in Essen, the Sozialistische Republik in Cologne and the Mannheimer Arbeiterzeitung in Mannheim.

In 26 November 1936, Husemann, his wife and father were arrested for helping a communist official hide. He and his father were sent to Sachsenhausen concentration camp without undertaking any trial proceedings, while his brother managed to escape and move to Moscow. Husemann was sent to Buchenwald concentration camp where he worked as a camp librarian until September 1938, when he was released. Marta was sent to Moringen concentration camp where she remained until June 1937, when she was released, after being seen by Heinrich Himmler who thought she looked too Aryan.

When he was released from prison in September 1938, Husemann went back to work as a toolmaker. Through Marta his wife, who had worked with Gunther Weisenborn, he was introduced into a resistance group around Harro Schulze-Boysen and Arvid Harnack. Husemann became an important member of Harro Schulze-Boysen group and would receive the pamphlets the group had written. Husemann remained with the group during its transition from an underground political faction that resisted into an espionage organisation.

In December 1941, John Sieg began publishing Die Innere Front (The Home Front) on a regular basis. Husemann through contact with fellow KPD member Wilhelm Guddorf, became involved in writing articles for the magazine.

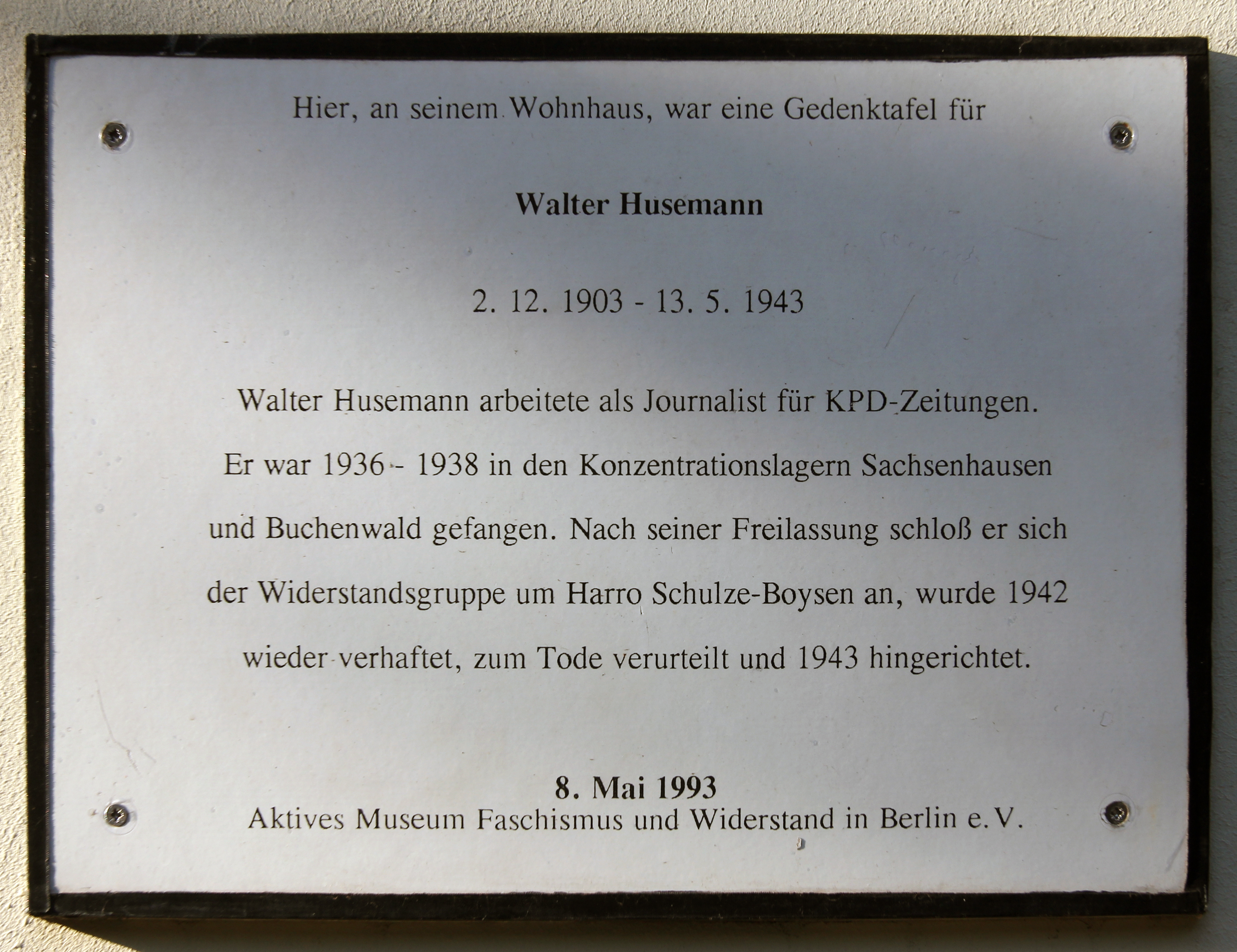
Memorial plaque on the house, 26 Florastraße in Pankow in Berlin

== Arrest ==
On 9 September 1942, Husemann was arrested at his employer. When he was interrogated, he tried to jump out a closed top-floor window. Husemann was sent for trial by the 2nd Senate of the Reichskriegsgericht, who announced on 26 January 1943 a sentence of death for "preparation for high treason" and "aiding and abetting espionage". He was executed on 13 May 1943 at Plötzensee Prison.
