= Eugen Neutert =

German communist and resistance fighter against Nazism

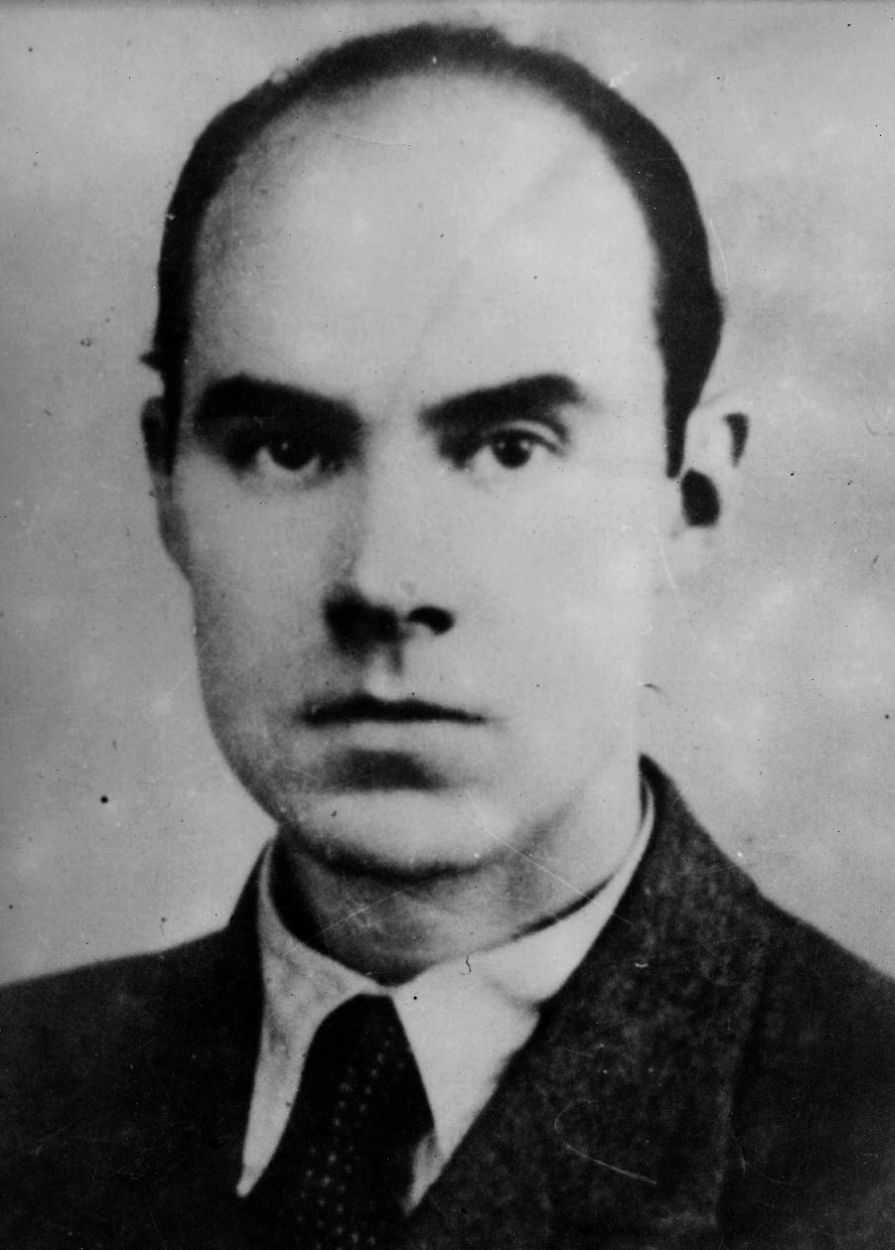
Eugen Neutert

Eugen Eduard Neutert (19 March 1905 – 9 September 1943) was a German communist and resistance fighter against Nazism.

== Biography ==
Neutert was born in the Hermsdorf district of Berlin. In 1923, he emigrated to Brazil where he lived until 1926, when he returned to Germany. Due to his membership in the Communist Party of Germany (KPD), Neutert was fired from his job as an electrician in 1928; he then earned a living as a masseur.

After the Nazi Party came to power in 1933, Neutert was active in the communist resistance. He was arrested on 16 September 1936, and sentenced to two and a half years' imprisonment by the People's Court, which he served in Brandenburg-Görden Prison and Amberg in Bavaria. After his release in spring 1939, Neutert continued his activities with the underground resistance. Working together with Hans Coppi who introduced him to the group around Wilhelm Schürmann-Horster and other members of the Red Orchestra, Neutert's main task was the production and distribution of flyers and leaflets; he was involved in the production of Die Innere Front (The Home Front), an illegal newspaper published by the Red Orchestra. Neutert managed to procure both a typewriter and the wax matrices that were to be used by the hectograph process for printing.

On 23 October 1942, Neutert was arrested once again. He was sentenced to death by the Volksgerichtshof in August 1943, and executed in Plötzensee Prison on 9 September the same year.

A stolperstein in memory of Neutert is located in Richard-Sorge-Straße 65 in the Friedrichshain district of Berlin, the address where he lived.
