= John Sieg =

German Communist and resistance fighter

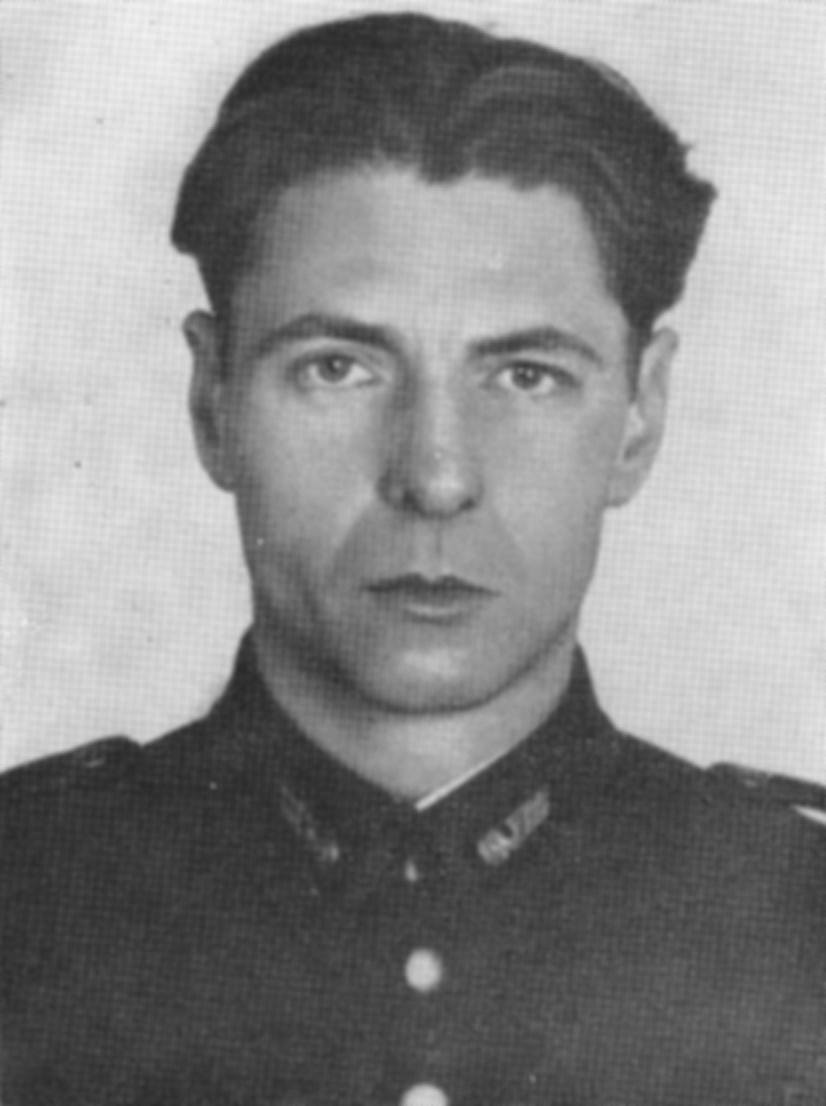
John Sieg

John Sieg (February 3, 1903 – October 15, 1942) was an American-born German Communist railroad worker, journalist and resistance fighter, who publicized Nazi atrocities through the underground Communist press and fought against National Socialism in the German Resistance. He was a key member of the anti-fascist resistance group that was later called the Red Orchestra by the Gestapo.

== Biography ==
John Sieg was born in Detroit, Michigan, the son of a mechanic. After the death of his father in 1912, he lived with his grandfather in Germany and became a German citizen in 1920.

In the beginning of the 1920s, Sieg went to school to become a teacher, but when his grandfather died in 1923, he had to quit. He returned to Detroit and met his future wife, Sophie, in 1924, while working as a college intern. He stayed in the United States until February 1928, when Sieg and his wife returned to Germany and he became a freelance author in Berlin.

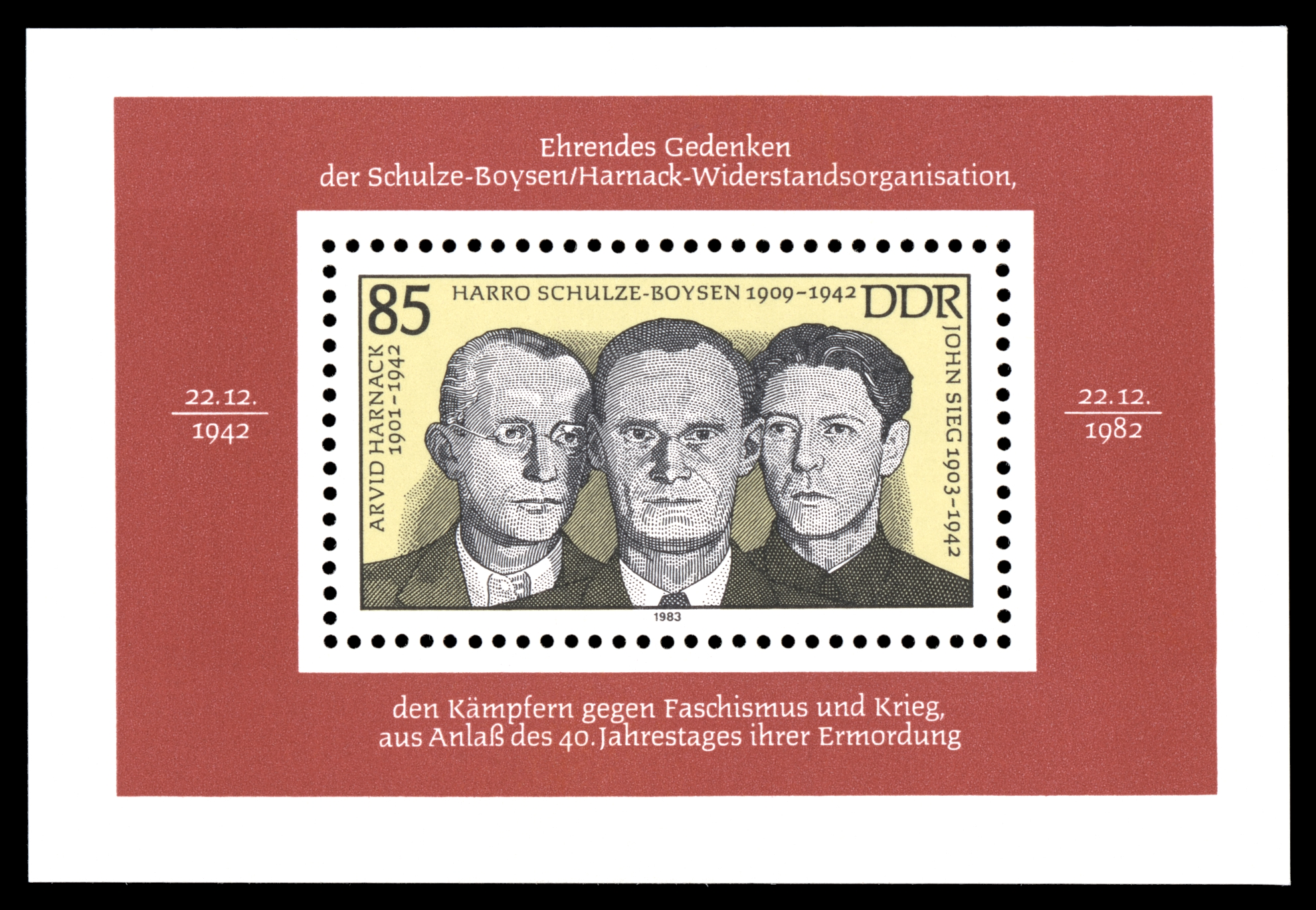
1983 Postage stamp of Red Orchestra members Harnack, Harro Schulze-Boysen and Sieg; from the GDR

He began writing articles for Die Tat, a newspaper published by Adam Kuckhoff. After joining the Communist Party of Germany (KPD) that same year, he began to write for the arts section of the KPD newspaper, Die Rote Fahne and he got to know Wilhelm Guddorf and Martin Weise.

He was arrested by the Sturmabteilung (storm troopers) in March 1933 and held till June. Upon his release, he began working with the Communist Resistance in the Berlin suburb of Neukölln, becoming the focal point of several groups. He had close contact with Arvid Harnack and Kuckhoff. He took part in leafletting campaigns and shared political information. In 1937, he got a job with the Deutsche Reichsbahn (worker in Stettiner Bahnhof, today Berlin Nordbahnhof), eventually working as a signaller at the S-Bahn station at Papestraße. As a railroad employee, Sieg was able to make use of work-related travel and free travel to build connections with other Resistance groups, such as the one organized around Bernhard Bästlein. He worked with Herbert Grasse, Otto Grabowski, and the Saefkow-Jacob-Bästlein Organization to produce the newspaper, Die Innere Front (The Internal Front). He was a core member of the Rote Kapelle, along with Guddorf and Kuckhoff.

He was arrested on 11 October 1942 and was taken to the Gestapo prison on Prinz-Albrecht-Straße, where he endured intensive interrogations and abuse. The previous spring, he had confided to a friend that if he were ever arrested, he would commit suicide rather than risk betraying friends. On 15 October 1942, following severe mistreatment, he hanged himself in his cell. Sieg's wife, Sophie, was also arrested in October 1942. Without trial, she was sent to Ravensbrück concentration camp in 1943. She was liberated by the Red Army in 1945.

== Legacy ==
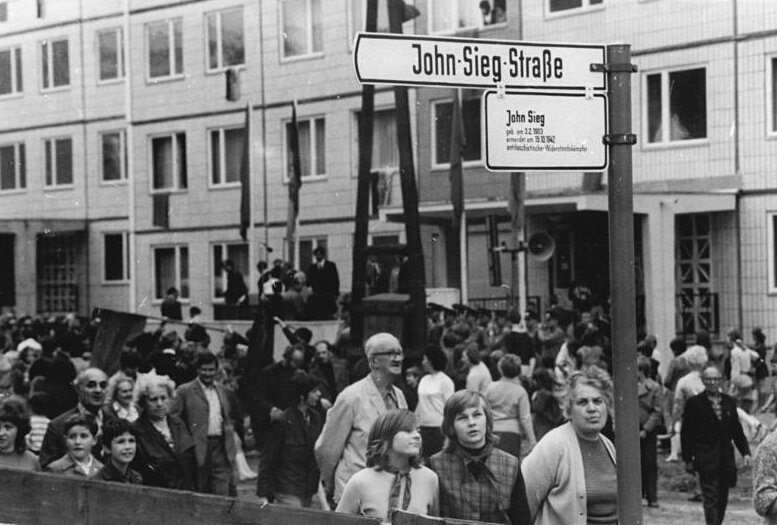
Street named after John Sieg in East Berlin, June 1972

A street in an area of new construction on Frankfurter Allee-Süd in Berlin-Lichtenberg was named after John Sieg on June 22, 1972.

== See also ==
- List of Germans who resisted Nazism
