= Ruthild Hahne =

German sculptor

- Hahne in 1955
- Born: 19 December 1910; Berlin, Germany
- Died: 1 September 2001 (aged 90); Berlin, Germany
- Occupations: resistance activist sculptor
- Political party: KPD; SED

Ruthild Hahne (19 December 1910 – 1 September 2001) was a German sculptor. Her most productive phase coincided with the early years of the German Democratic Republic (East Germany).

== Life ==
=== Provenance and early years ===
Ruthild Hahne was born in Berlin. Her father is variously described as a businessman and as a factory owner. Elsewhere her parents are described as distant and domineering. She grew up in a prosperous household in a substantial family home in Berlin's Schmöckwitz quarter. The household included a housekeeper, a gardener and a chauffeur. She attended the single-sex secondary school in the city's Neukölln quarter. While she was there someone lent her a book by Karl Marx which she took home and read. Uncomprehending but captivated, this in due course triggered Hahne's enduring commitment to socialist values which was at variance with her parents' middle-class conservatism.

=== Career choices ===
On leaving school she trained as a gymnastics-orthopedics teacher, and for several years worked as a gymnastics teacher, pursuing this career till 1936. Despite her background she had already made contact with elements of the labour movement and Communist Party. In 1930 she first met Jean Weidt, and in the early 1930s was a member of Weidt's expressionist "Red Dancers" company. Between 1931 and 1933 she took part in performances at Communist Party events. In 1933 she even took part in the first Theatre Olympiad Review in Moscow. However, 1933 was also the year in which, in January, the political backdrop was transformed when the Nazi Party took power and converted Germany into a one-party dictatorship. Jean Weidt himself fled abroad in May 1933, and Ruthild Hahne's parallel career as a member of a communist expressionist dance company came to an end. A couple of years later she quit her teaching job, and between 1936 and 1940 studied sculpture at the Berlin Arts Academy. Here she eventually became a "master student" of Wilhelm Gerstel. Another of her teachers was Arno Breker, who was by now becoming a high-profile government supporter. In 1940/41 she received a bursary to study at the Villa Massimo art institute in Rome. This period saw her produce her classically formed small sculptures and portraits of children.

=== Resistance ===
Wilhelm Gerstel's other master students included Fritz Cremer and Cay-Hugo von Brockdorff. After the coming to power of the Nazis it was through these fellow students that Hahne came into contact with Wolfgang Thiess with whom she fell in love. In 1941 they moved in together. Since 1938 Ruthild Hahne had been identified by the Gestapo as a member of the Red Orchestra ("Rote Kapelle"), a classification used by the authorities that included those believed to be involved in political activism or espionage activities on behalf of the Soviet Union. In the case of the Berlin Arts Academy there was indeed a resistance group among the arts students and Ruthild Hahne, reflecting her socialist beliefs, participated in it.

Her apartment at Nachodstraße 20 in the Berlin quarter of Wilmersdorf became a meeting point for resistance members and appears to have been one of the places where she worked with comrades on production of "Die innere Front" ("The Home Front"), an illegal anti-government news-sheet.

In Autumn 1942 the resistance cell was uncovered and its members were arrested on 21 October 1942. They faced the special "people's court" on 21 August 1943 and were convicted of performing illegal actions. Hahne's partner, Wolfgang Thiess, was sentenced to death and executed on 9 September 1943. Ruthild Hahne received a prison sentence of slightly less than five years. By this time, however, the world war had turned against Germany and the Soviet army had started a long advance from the east that would culminate in the capture of Berlin. In February 1945 Hahne was able to escape from the women's prison in Cottbus where she was being held: she now joined up with the Red army. War ended in May 1945 and in June 1945 Ruthilde Hahne returned to Berlin, penniless but free. She now lost no time in joining the Communist Party of Germany and when, in April 1946, within what would later become East Germany the party was controversially merged to form the new Socialist Unity Party ("Sozialistische Einheitspartei Deutschlands" / SED), she was among the thousands who lost no time in signing their membership across to what quickly evolved to become the ruling party for a new kind of German dictatorship.

=== Sculptor ===
With Berlin now surrounded by the Soviet occupation zone, and the eastern part of the city administered as part of it, Hahne acquired an apartment in what was becoming the Breitenbach Square (Breitenbachplatz) artists' quarter. Between 1946 and 1950 she worked as a teacher at the Applied Arts Academy (later better known as the Weißensee Arts Academy), of which some sources identify her as a co-founder. In her first major exhibition, held in the Arsenal Museum (Zeughaus) she included a Head of Lenin which, according to her son, created a stir. It showed not merely the familiar power and energy of the man, but also a less familiar warmth and approachability. This opened the way to a career as a portrait sculptor, with busts of national heroes such as Karl Liebknecht (1950) and political leaders such as Wilhelm Pieck (1960) and even Walter Ulbricht (1963) that were displayed in schools and ministries. In October 1949 the Soviet occupation zone was relaunched as the German Democratic Republic (East Germany), and Hahne's political portrait-busts were and also presented as gifts to leaders of the new country's "socialist brother nations". Along with her more directly political portraiture, Hahne also produced more portrait-busts of children. In 1953 Ruthild Hahne beat 182 rivals in a competition to provide a vast memorial to the former Communist leader Ernst Thälmann, to be placed what became, till 1986, Thälmann Square (Thälmannplatz). The work in some ways represented a career highlight, but was never completed. A succession of practical challenges delayed the project which then received its deathblow in 1961 with the erection of the Berlin Wall directly adjacent to its intended location. By this time, too, tastes had changed, and even in East Germany the imposing scale of the proposed memorial led to its characterisation in one official report as a "vulgar superficially illustrative realist construct" ("vulgäre, äußerlich illustrative Realismusauffassung"). There was also personal criticism of Hahne's "sinecure" based life style. Hahne was finally obliged to end work on the project in 1965: in the end, it was not till 1986 that a new national leader, Erich Honecker sanctioned Berlin's official public memorial to Thälmann, but it was placed in a different location and produced by a different artist, comrade Lev Kerbel.

After the long-running saga of the Thälmann Square memorial, Hahne's public profile was somewhat diminished. She nevertheless continued to produce portrait busts, notably of the writers Bruno Apitz (1966) and Kurt Stern (1968). In 1971, which coincidentally or not was the year in which Walter Ulbricht lost power, Ruthild Hahne was awarded the Patriotic Order of Merit in silver. It was only in 1985 that she was able to hold her first personal exhibition.

== Legacy ==
Ruthild Hahne's legacy has been nurtured by her adopted son, Dr. Stefan Hahne. Between 09.00 and 15.00 he works as an Egyptologist, studying hieroglyphs. The second part of the afternoon he devotes to his mother's former studio, where he still lives and curates what has become a private museum where in 2008 it was reported that visitors could sometimes take the opportunity study Ruthild Hahne's work.

Parts of the Thälmann memorial to which she devoted so many years were destroyed after 1965. Others, including notably a half sized image of Thälmann and a group of "workers and peasants" positioned behind him, can still be seen at the studio-museum curated by her son at house number 201/1 in Berlin-Niederschönhausen. The Berlin Märkische Museum also houses two quarter-sized sections of Hahne's frieze design for the memorial.
