= Fritz Cremer =

German sculptor (1906–1993)

- Cremer in 1955
- Born: October 22, 1906; Arnsberg, Germany
- Died: September 1, 1993 (aged 86); Berlin, Germany
- Education: Christian Meisen, United State Schools for Fine and Applied Art (1929), Villa Massimo (1937-1938), Academy of Arts, Berlin (1938)
- Notable work: Revolt of the Prisoners, Buchenwald

Fritz Cremer (22 October 1906 – 1 September 1993) was a German sculptor. Cremer was considered a key figure in the art and cultural politics of East Germany. He is most notable for being the creator of the "Revolt of the Prisoners" ("Revolte der Gefangenen") memorial sculpture at the former concentration camp of Buchenwald.

== Life ==
Fritz Cremer was the son of the upholsterer and decorator Albert Cremer. One year after his father's death, his mother Christine Cremer moved to Rellinghausen with her children Fritz and Emmy in 1908. In 1911, the family moved to Essen, where Christine began a second marriage with a teacher. After his mother died in 1922, Cremer lived with a miner's family.

In 1929, the Austrian expressive dancer Hanna Berger met Cremer and the two began a romantic relationship. In autumn 1942, Berger was arrested by the Gestapo for her work as a campaigner in Kurt Schumacher's resistance group. In 1944, Berger was able to escape from prison when she was being transferred to Ravensbrück concentration camp during a bombing. She lived illegally in Styria until the end of the war.

In 1953, Cremer married Christa von Carnap (1921–2010), a painter and ceramicist who had divorced shortly before. She was the daughter of Alfred von Carnap (1894–1965), a merchant from the Wilmersdorf area of Berlin, and his first wife Susanne Schindler. Christa von Carnap had previously been married to the Schöneberg-based sculptor Waldemar Grzimek.

== Career ==
Cremer trained as a stone sculptor under Christian Meisen in Essen from 1921 to 1925 after finishing grammar school. During his subsequent work as a journeyman stonemason, he executed some sculptures based on models by Will Lammert and attended sculpture courses at the Folkwang School in Essen during this time. In 1929, as a committed communist, he decided to join the Communist Party of Germany (KPD). He took up studies at the "United State Schools for Fine and Applied Art", (Vereinigte Staatsschulen für Freie und Angewandte Kunst) in Charlottenburg with Wilhelm Gerstel (1879–1963), whose master student he became from 1934 to 1938. During this time Cremer shared a studio with Kurt Schumacher and produced his first socially-critical etchings. In 1934 he travelled to Paris. During a trip to London in 1937, Cremer met the writer and playwright Bertolt Brecht, the composer Hans Eisler and the actor Helene Weigel there, who advised him to continue working in Germany. Twice he was a guest of the Villa Massimo in Rome. The first time was in 1937-1938 where he was awarded a fellowship to study for the year, after winning a prize at the "Preußischen Staatspreis für Bildhauerei" (Prussian State Prize for Sculpture). The second time in 1942-43. At the Prussian Academy of Arts, Cremer now ran a master studio himself. He was in close contact with the Red Orchestra resistance group around the sculptor Kurt Schumacher and the writer Walter Küchenmeister. Cremer was linked to a resistance group associated with the actor Wilhelm Schürmann-Horster via Hanna Berger.

His communist past, possibly not particularly spectacular in terms of political action, seems not to have been taken into account by the Nazi regime; but this is by no means a singular case since talents of all kinds were sought after and employed in the culture industries as long as they kept quiet about their former political options.

From 1940 to 1944, he served in the Wehrmacht as an anti-aircraft soldier in Eleusis and on the island of Crete, after which Cremer became a prisoner of war in Yugoslavia. While he was a soldier would spend any extended leave in Rome where the German Academy had been taken over by the German army. In October 1946, vouched for by his party comrades, he was awarded a professorship and the chair of sculpture department of the Academy for Applied Art in Vienna.

== Visual representation in the arts ==
- Sabine Grzimek: Portrait of Fritz Cremer (Bronze sculptor, 1982).
- Dieter Goltzsche: Portrait Fritz Cremer (lithograph, 47.7 × 34.5 cm, 1969)
- Gabriele Mucci: Portrait Fritz Cremer (oil, 100 × 72 cm, 1963)

== Memorial designs ==
During his time in Austria, Cremer designed two memorials for the victims of fascism, a small one for the French prisoners at Mauthausen near Linz in Austria and a very important and controversial one at the Vienna Central Cemetery, the Memorial for the victims of a free Austria 1934–1945. Controversy was sparked off by the memorial's dedication to the victims of Fascism as from 1934, the year that an authoritarian regime accepted by the Catholic Church took power in Austria. The memorial represented a naked bronze figure of a resistance fighter, which was considered controversial. Theodor Innitzer, the Archbishop of Vienna wanted a fig leaf placed on the sculpture, which Cremer did not accept.

== GDR ==
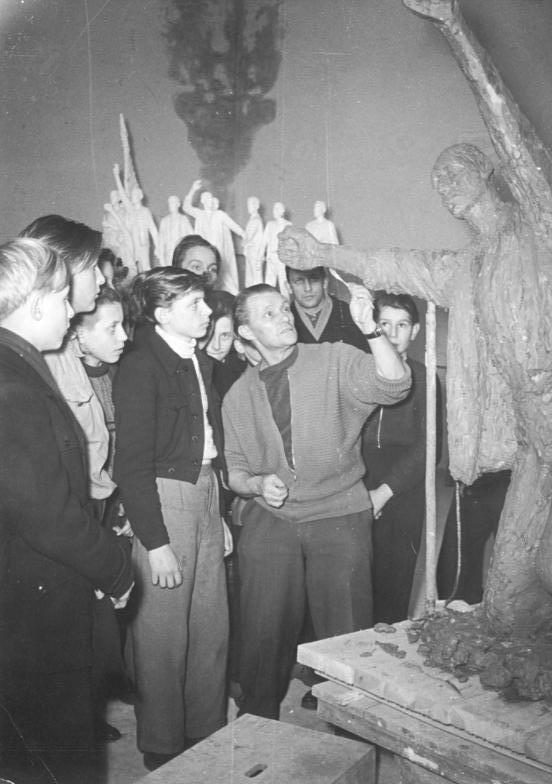
Fritz Cremer with a group of students in his studio, 1955

In 1950, Cremer had moved to the German Democratic Republic and took over the master class at the Academy of the Arts, later serving as vice-president from 1974 to 1983. His most important work by far during his earlier life in the GDR is his 1958 bronze sculpture "Revolt of the Prisoners" (Revolte der Gefangenen); set in front of a bell tower, high up in the hills above Weimar, the grouping of 11 figures, some gesturing triumphantly, forms the focal point of a memorial at the site of the former concentration camp of Buchenwald. Cremer was respected in the GDR because he sometimes spoke up against the communist regime's stubborn denial of modernism and artistic liberty; he was never censored since no doubt seems ever to have been cast on his political sincerity. Part of his authority, of course, was due to his decision to move to the East and to denounce Western policies during the Cold War. A good example of his intransigency, comparable to that of the right-wing caricaturist Andreas Paul Weber in West Germany, was the widely distributed and quite masterly cycle of lithographs in which he denounced the Hungarian rebellion, shortly after the event.

A further memorial at Mauthausen was commissioned in 1961 from Cremer by the German Democratic Republic's Association of Victims of Fascism and completed in 1965-1955. This memorial known as "O Deutschland, bleiche Mutter" in bronze dominates a pivotal area of the former concentration camp, the access road to the stone quarries where most of the camp's victims died.

== Thematics ==
In Fritz Cremer's work, the acts and lovers form the thematic counterpart to the political commissioned works, and also served to calm down and retreat into the private. In them, “her true features and erotic sensuality unite,” “close together, tenderness and fulfilment.” Stylistically, it cannot be assigned to modernity or to socialist realism. The aim of Cremer's artistic efforts was to make the “mentalic constitution” of the presented. For this reason, Cremer breaks with the idealising representation of the body, while stressing its irregularities. Cremer was an excellent draughtsman; his prints and drawings are sometimes far more interesting than his later works of sculpture, from the 1970s onwards.

== Overview of creations ==
=== Sculpture and busts ===
- 1936: Relief Trauernde Frauen (Gestapo)
- 1936–1937: Bust self-portrait as dying warrior, (Büste Selbstbildnis als sterbender Krieger)
- 1939: Figurengruppe Mütter
- 1947: Freedom Fighter (Freiheitskämpfer)
- 1946–1948: Memorial to the Victims of Fascism 1934-1945, Vienna (Mahnmal für die Opfer des Faschismus 1934–1945, Wien)
- 1949: Memorial stone for the Ebensee concentration camp (Gedenkstein für das KZ Ebensee)
- 1950–1953: Memorial to the Nazi Victims Knittelfeld (Denkmal für die NS-Opfer Knittelfeld) (Österreich)
- 1950: 1950: Large Eva nude figure (Aktfigur Große Eva)
- 1951: Seated Figure Mother Earth for the Mourning Hall of the Baumschulenweg Crematorium (Sitzende Figur Mutter Erde für die Trauerhalle des Krematoriums Baumschulenweg) (Berlin)
- 1951–1952: Sculptural design for the Marx-Engels Monument (plastischer Entwurf zum Marx-Engels-Denkmal), Berlin (nicht ausgeführt)
- 1952–1958: Group of figures for the Buchenwald Monument (Figurengruppe für das Buchenwalddenkmal)
- 1958: Aufbauhelferin und Aufbauhelfer in einer Grünanlage östlich vom Roten Rathaus
- 1959: Schwimmerin.
- 1960–1967: Memorial to the Mauthausen Concentration Camp "O Germany, Pale Mother (Denkmal für das KZ Mauthausen, "O Deutschland, bleiche Mutter")
- 1958–1965: Group of figures for the Ravensbrück Concentration Camp Memorial Site (Figurengruppe für die Mahn- und Gedenkstätte Ravensbrück)
- 1964: Bronze Bust Hans Eisler (Bronzebüste Hans Eisler)
- 1964–1965: Ascending, park of the UN headquarters, New York (Aufsteigender – den um ihre Freiheit kämpfenden Völkern gewidmet; Park des UNO-Hauptquartiers, New York (weitere Güsse dieser Plastik stehen vor der Kunsthalle Rostock und im Skulpturenpark Magdeburg)
- 1967–1968: Spanienkämpfer – Denkmal für die deutschen Interbrigadisten in Berlin-Friedrichshain
- 1967–1968: Ascending III (Aufsteigender III)
- 1968: Karl Marx Monument (Karl-Marx-Denkmal) (Frankfurt)
- 1969–1972: Galileo Galilei „Und sie bewegt sich doch!“ (Stadthalle Chemnitz)
- 1972: Great Lovers (Großes Liebespaar)
- 1972: Entwurf zum Denkmal 50 Jahre Oktoberrevolution
- 1978: Auferstehender I
- 1979: The Swimmer (Die Schwimmerin)
- 1982–1985: Auferstehender II
- 1984: Freiheitskämpfer (Skulptur) in Bremen
- 1986–1989: Denkmal für Bertolt Brecht, Berlin, Bertolt-Brecht-Platz
- 1988: Karl-Marx, Neuhardenberg, Dorfanger
- 1991: Karl-Marx

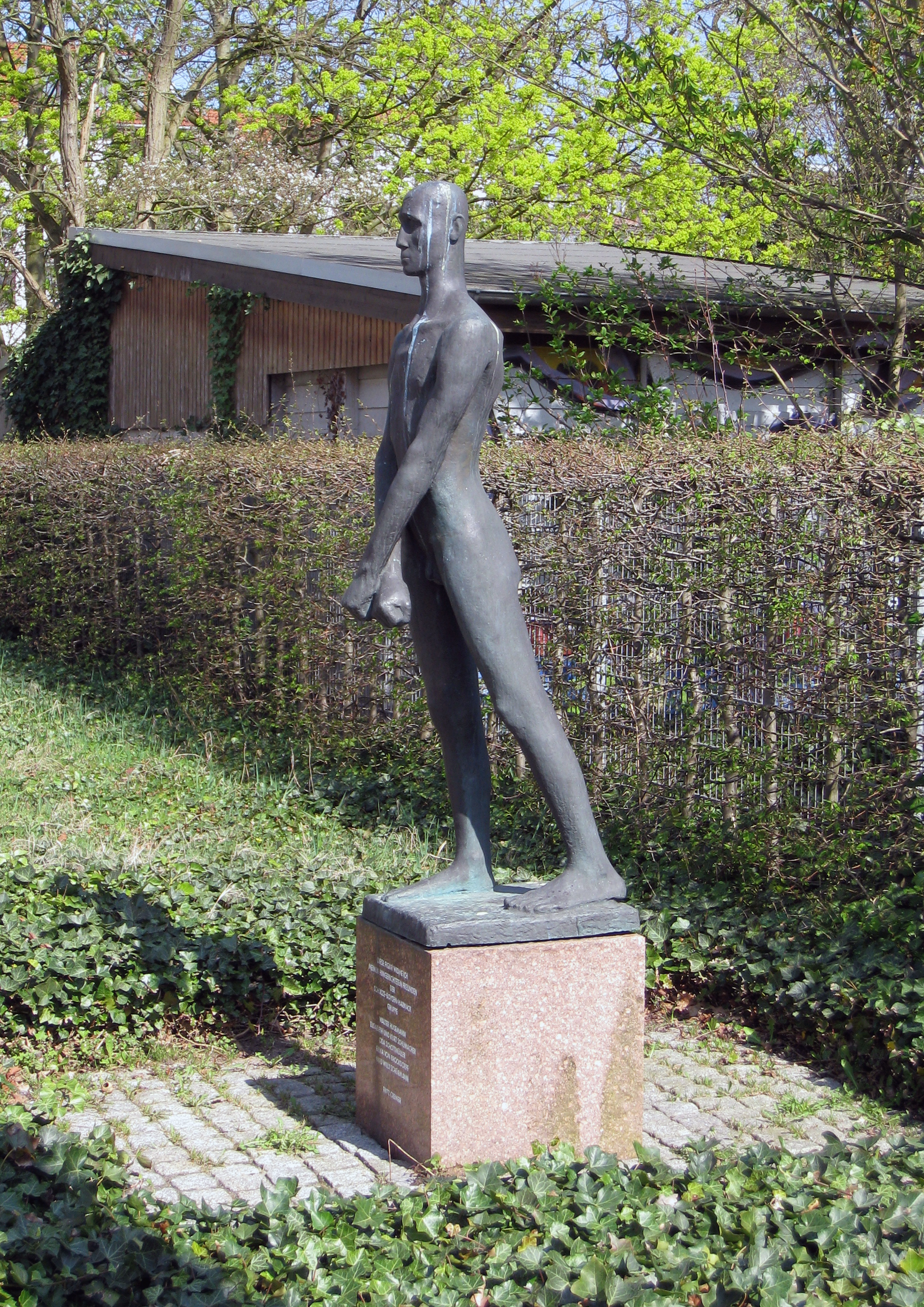
Freedom Fighters, replica of the sculpture from 1947, which has stood in Bremen near the Ostertorwache since 1984 and is dedicated to Cremer's executed friends from the Berlin Red Orchestra ("Rote Kapelle").

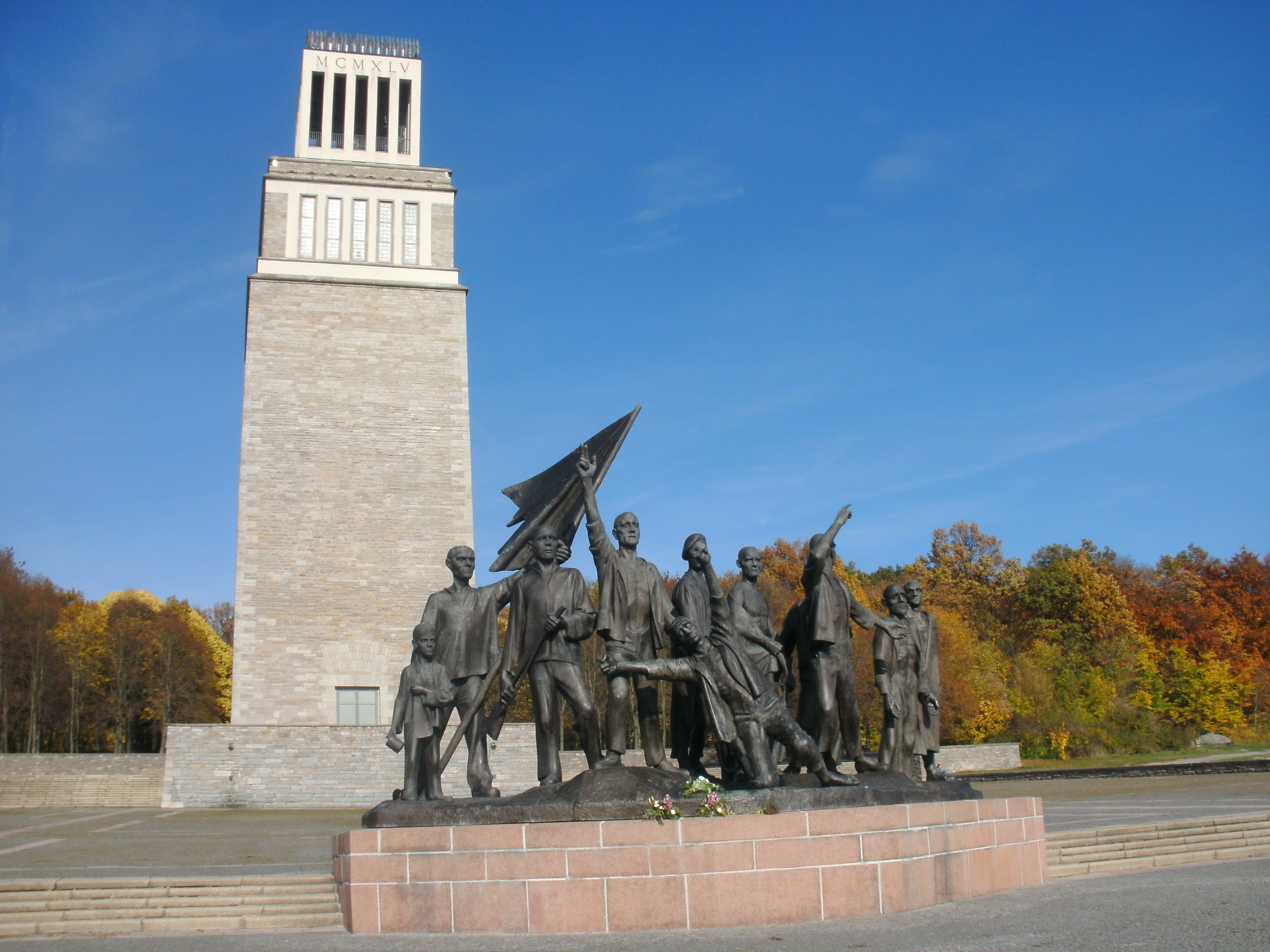
The Buchenwald memorial (1952-1958)

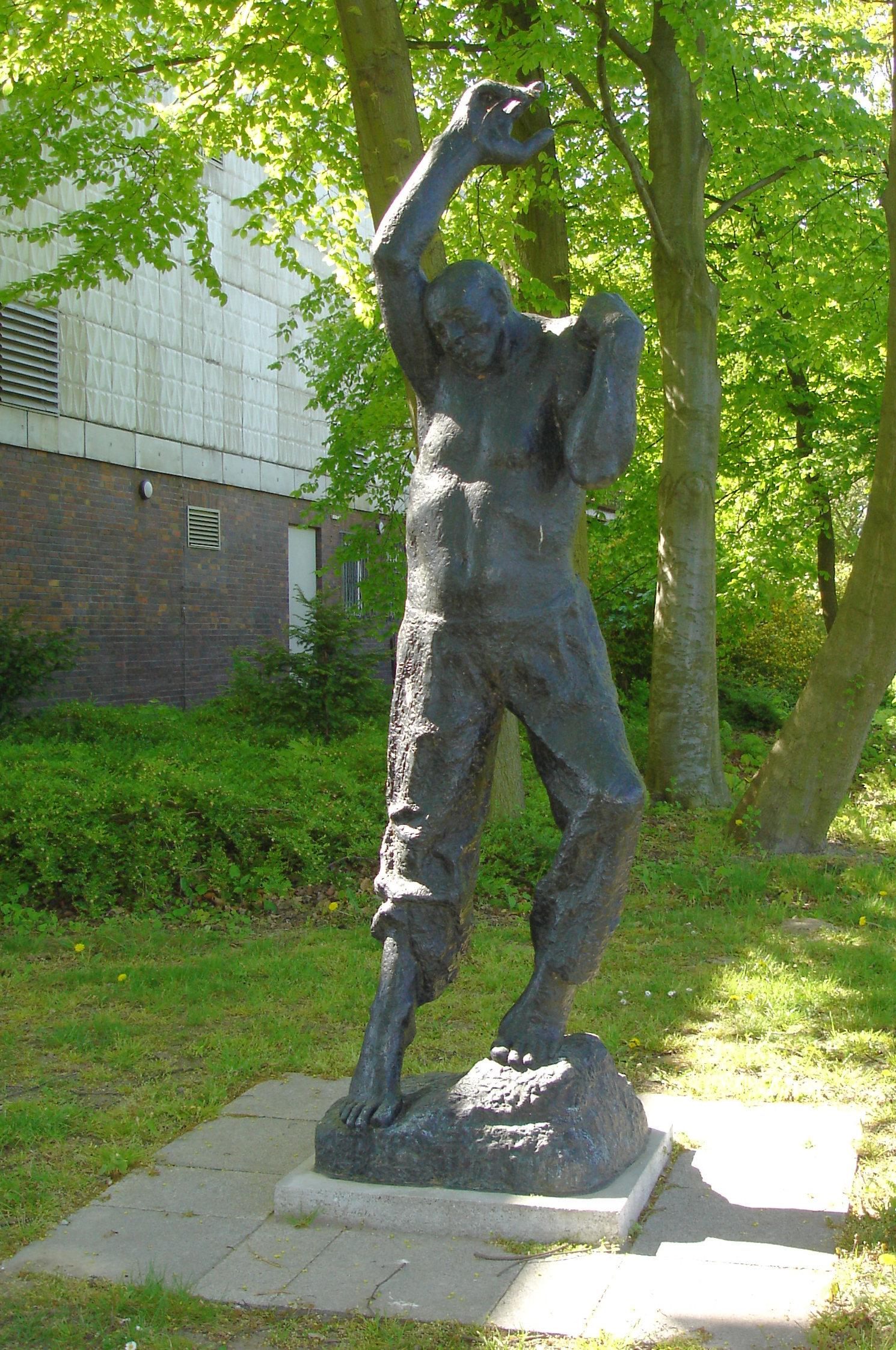
Ascending 1966-1967

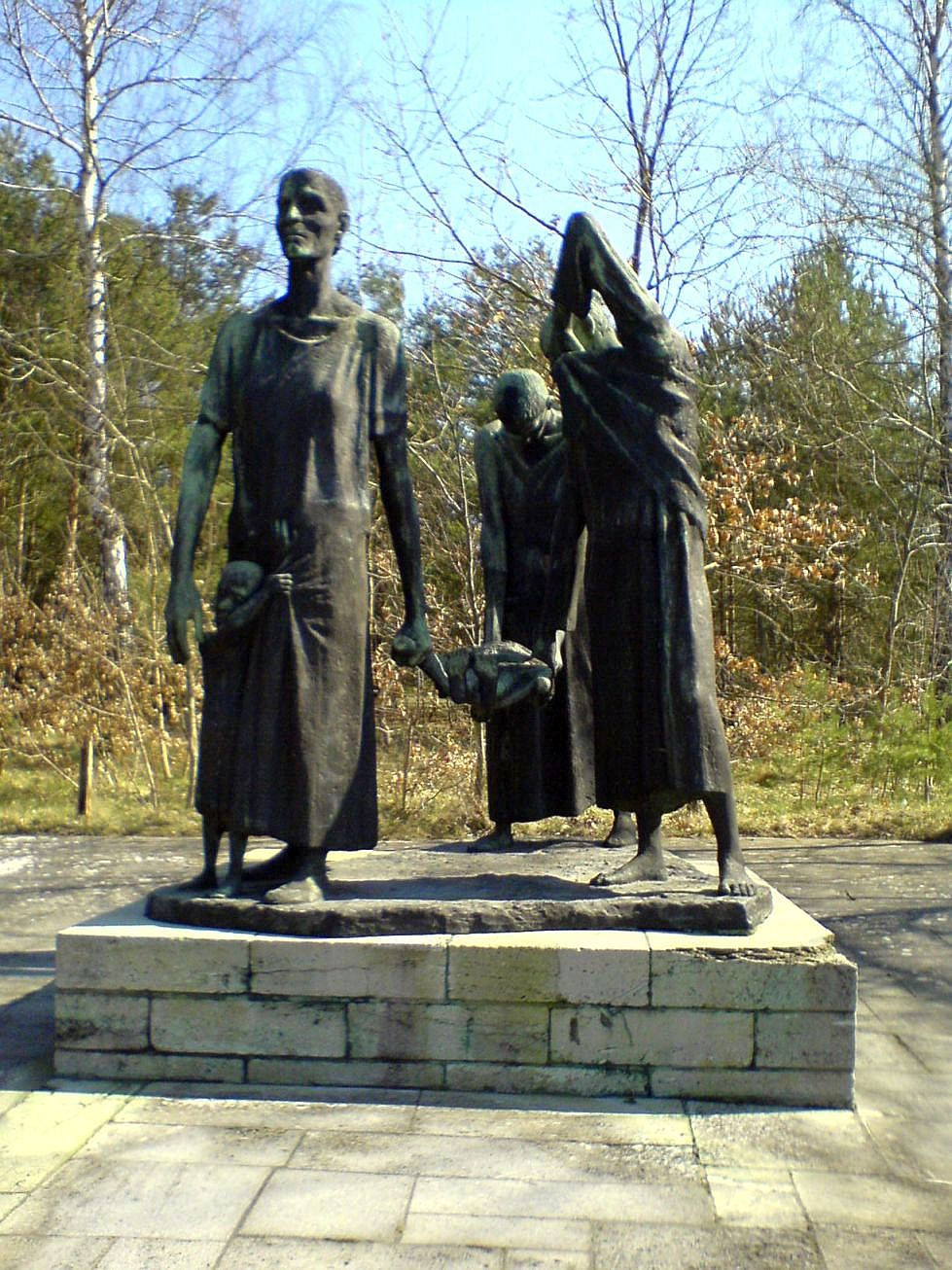
Müttergruppe Fritz Cremer 1965 (photo 2007; sculpture re-erected after renovation in 2011)

=== Drawings and lithographs ===
- 1956: Never again, (Nie wieder)
- 1956: Mappe Walpursgisnacht (36 Blätter)
- 1962: Selbstbildnis
- 1963: Kreidekreis
- 1966: Fragen eines lesenden Arbeiters (zu Brechts Gedicht)
- 1979: "Genug gekreuzigt!"
- 1986: Mappe Mutter Coppi und die Anderen, Alle!
- 1988: Fritz Cremer Lithographien 1955–88

=== Book illustrations ===
- Cremer, Fritz (1959). Buchenwald Studien Buchenwald Studien (1st ed.). Berlin: Verlag der Nation. OCLC 1280532770.
- Fritz Cremer; Akademie der Künste der Deutschen Demokratischen Republik (1986). Für Mutter Coppi und die Anderen, Alle! : Graphische Folge. Berlin: Akademie dr Künste der DDR. OCLC 856800950.

=== Exhibitions ===
The following exhibitions were held by Cremer:

- Karl Eulenstein, oil paintings, Fritz Cremer, sculpture: Galerie Karl Buchholz: 42nd exhibition from 18 Nov. to 9 Dec. 1939.
- 1951: Berlin, collective exhibition at the Academy of Arts
- 1956: Berlin, collective exhibition for the 50th birthday in the National Gallery
- 1959: Cairo and Alexandria, collective exhibitions
- 1960: Schwerin, Greifswald, Stralsund, Demmin, Eisenach, Magdeburg
- 1966: Budapest, Halle and Berlin
- 1967: Copenhagen, Erfurt and Rostock
- 1968: Berlin
- 1970: Oslo, Copenhagen and Bonn
- 1973: Budapest
- 1976: Warsaw
- 1976: Berlin, Altes Museum
- 1977: Sofia and Moscow
- 1977: documenta 6, Kassel
- 1980: Duisburg, Wilhelm Lehmbruck Museum
- 1982: Bremen
- 1984: Berlin, Pergamon Museum
- 1987: Stockholm
- 1991: Arnsberg, Sauerland Museum
- 1996: Arnsberg
- 2000: Oberhausen Castle
- 2007: Arnsberg
- 2009: Frankfurt am Main and Leipzig, Schwind Gallery
- 2010: Dresden, Beyer Gallery
- 2011: Frankfurt am Main, Schwind Gallery

== Awards and honors ==
=== Awards ===
- 1953: National Prize II Class for the bust of the miner and National Prize winner Franz Franik
- 1958: National Prize I. Class for the Buchenwald Memorial
- 1961: Art Prize of the FDGB for the portrait bust of Bert Brecht
- 1965: Fatherland Order of Merit in Gold
- 1972: Goethe Prize of the City of Berlin
- 1972: National Prize I. Class for the Complete Works
- 1974: Order of Karl Marx
- 1976: Hero of Labour
- 1978: Order of the Flag of the People's Republic of Hungary
- 1981: Bremen Sculpture Prize
- 1981: Honorary Gold Medal of the Order of Merit of the Federal Republic of Germany

=== Honours ===
In 1967 Cremer became an Honorary Member of the Academy of Arts of the USSR.

== Gallery ==
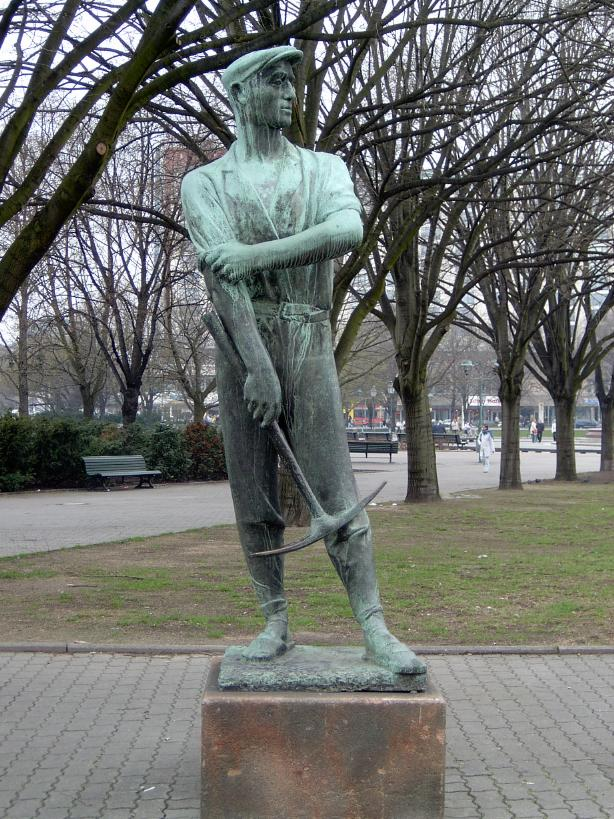
Bronze sculptor Aufbauhelfer, 1952-1953

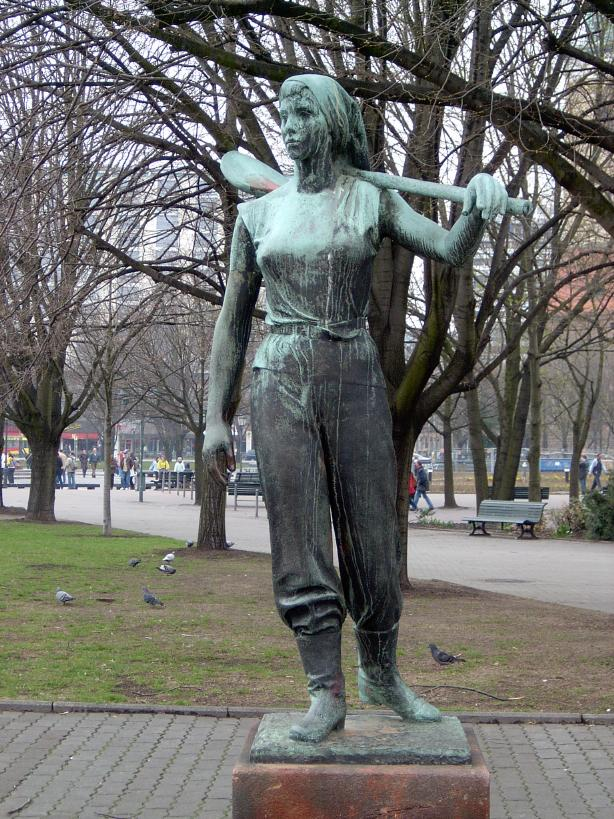
Bronze sculptor Aufbauhelferin, 1954

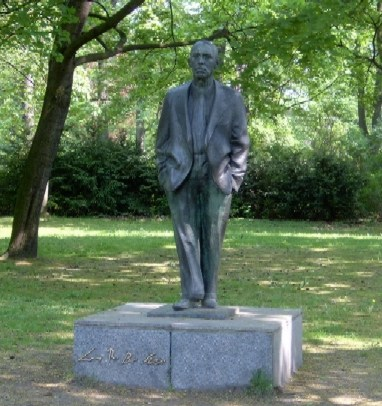
Bronze sculptor Johannes Becher, 1960

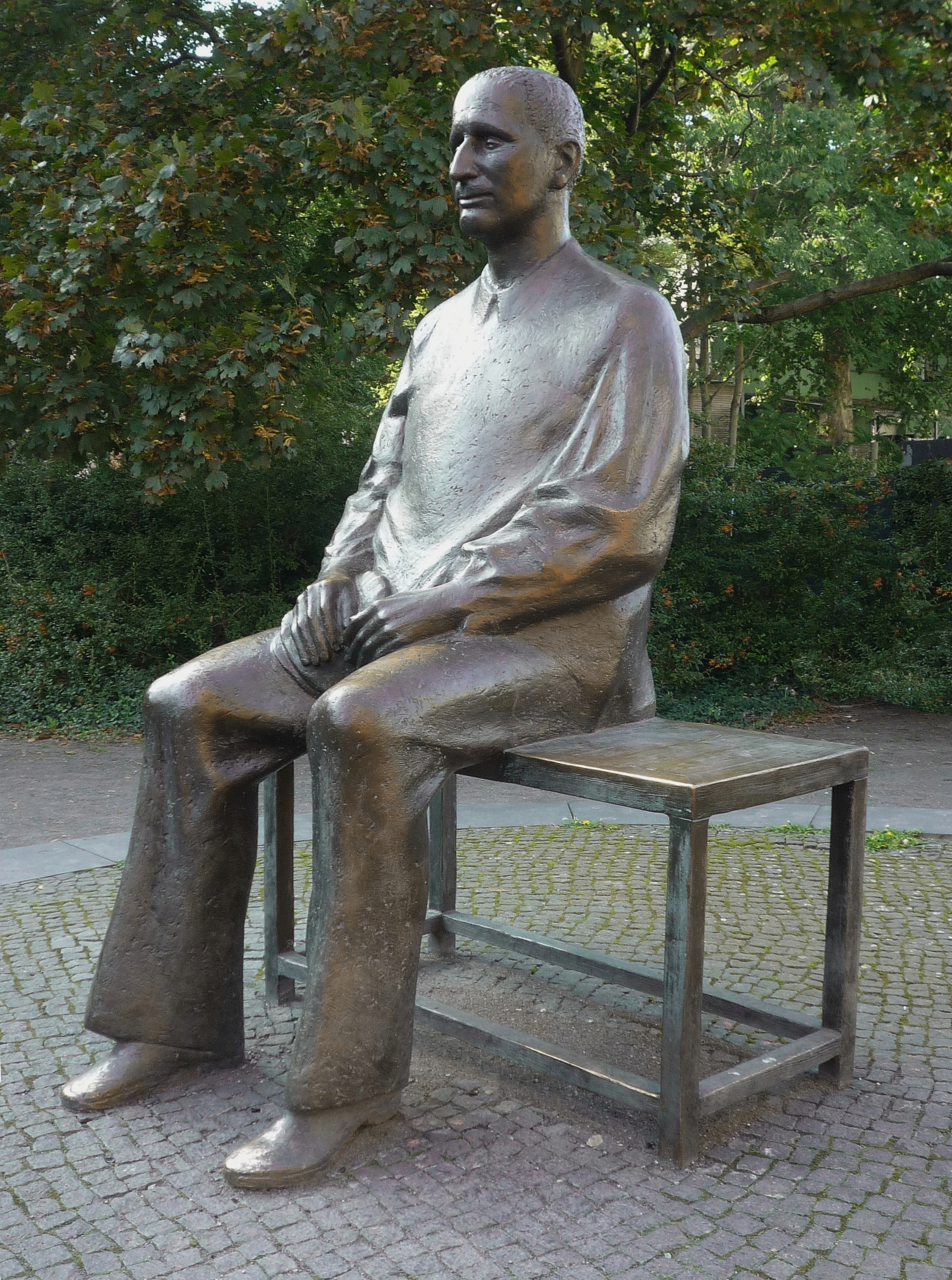
Bronze sculptor Memorial to Bertold Brecht, 1986-1989

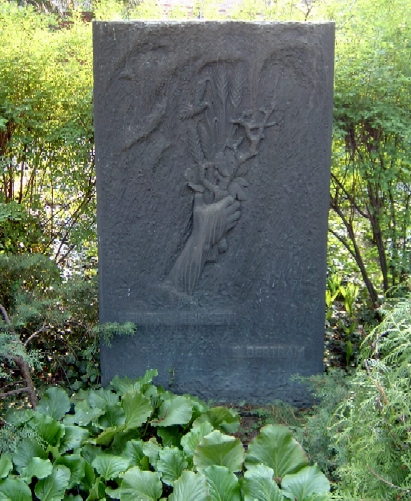
Gravestone of Heinrich Ehmsen

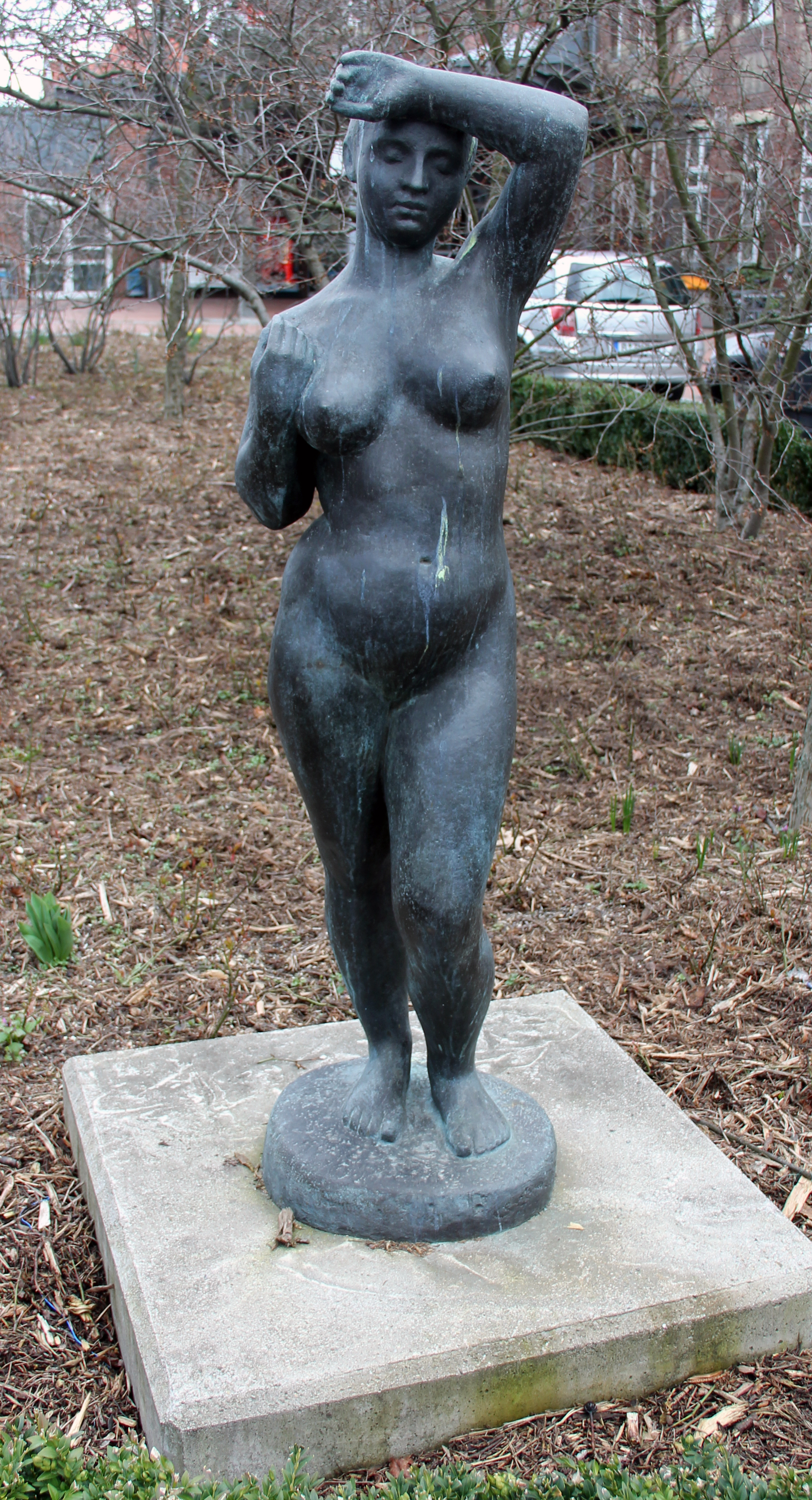
Bronze sculptor, Große Eva, 1950

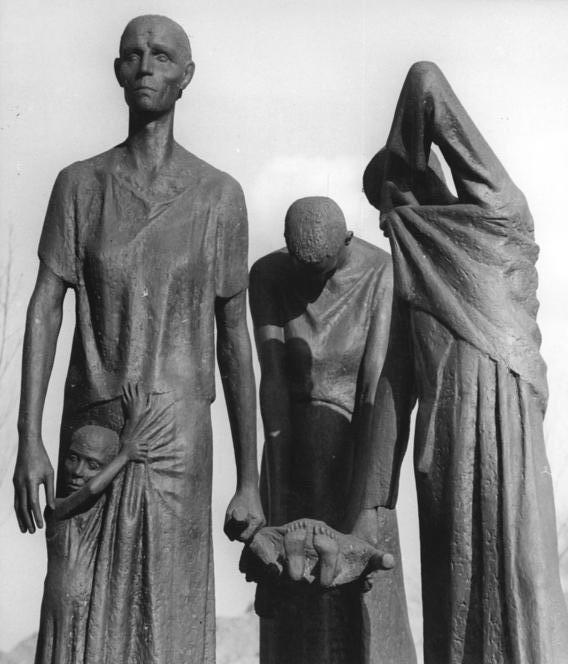
Müttergruppe Ravensbrück, 1965

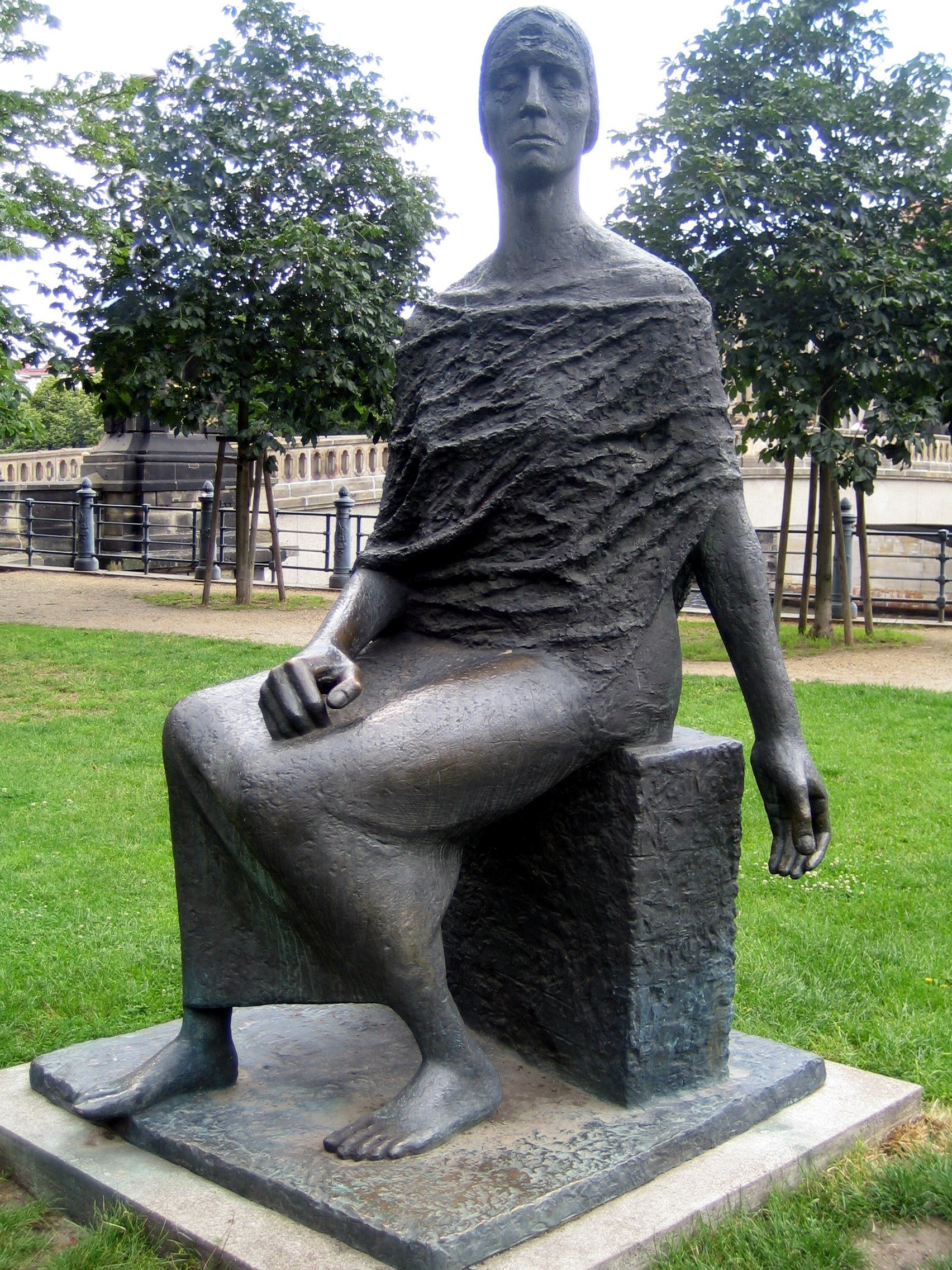
Bronze sculpture, O Deutschland bleiche Mutter, 1965-1966

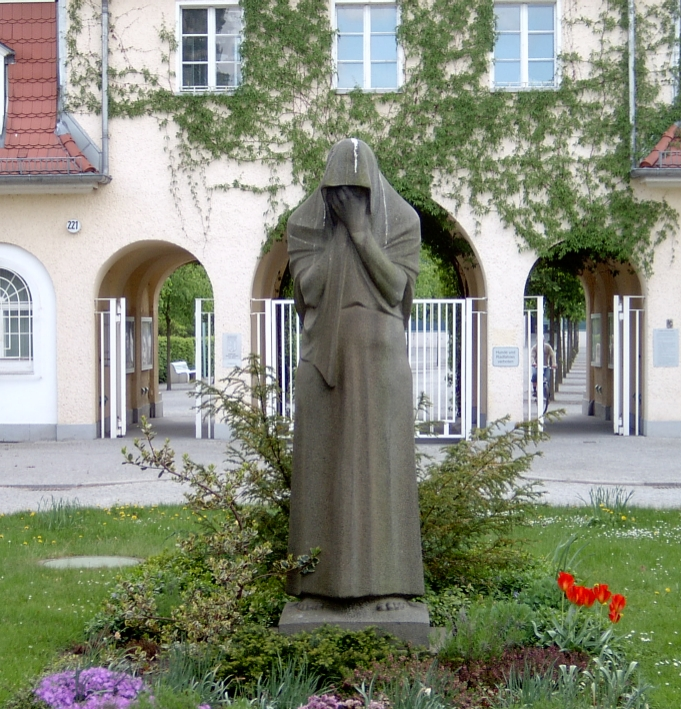
Die Trauernde, 1947-1948

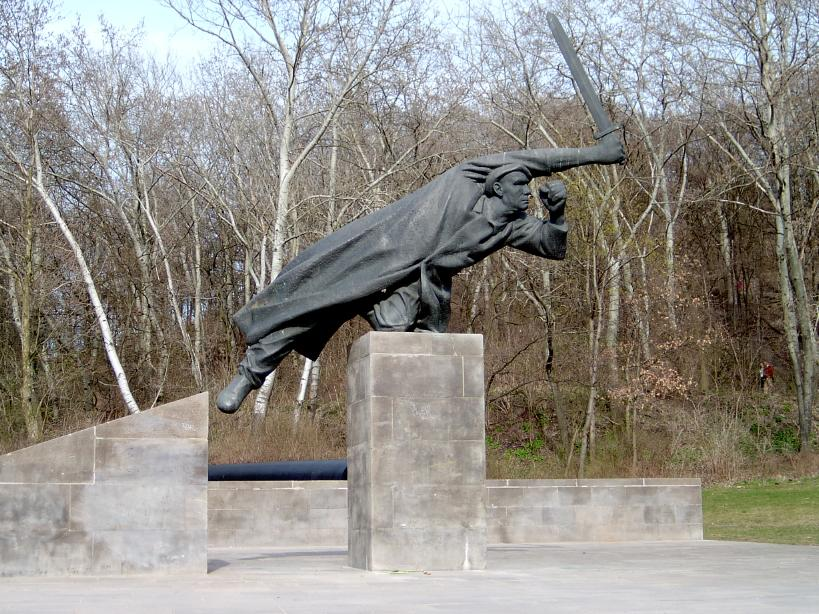
Denkmal für deutsche Spanienkämpfer, 1967-1968
