= Memorial for the victims of a free Austria 1934–1945 =

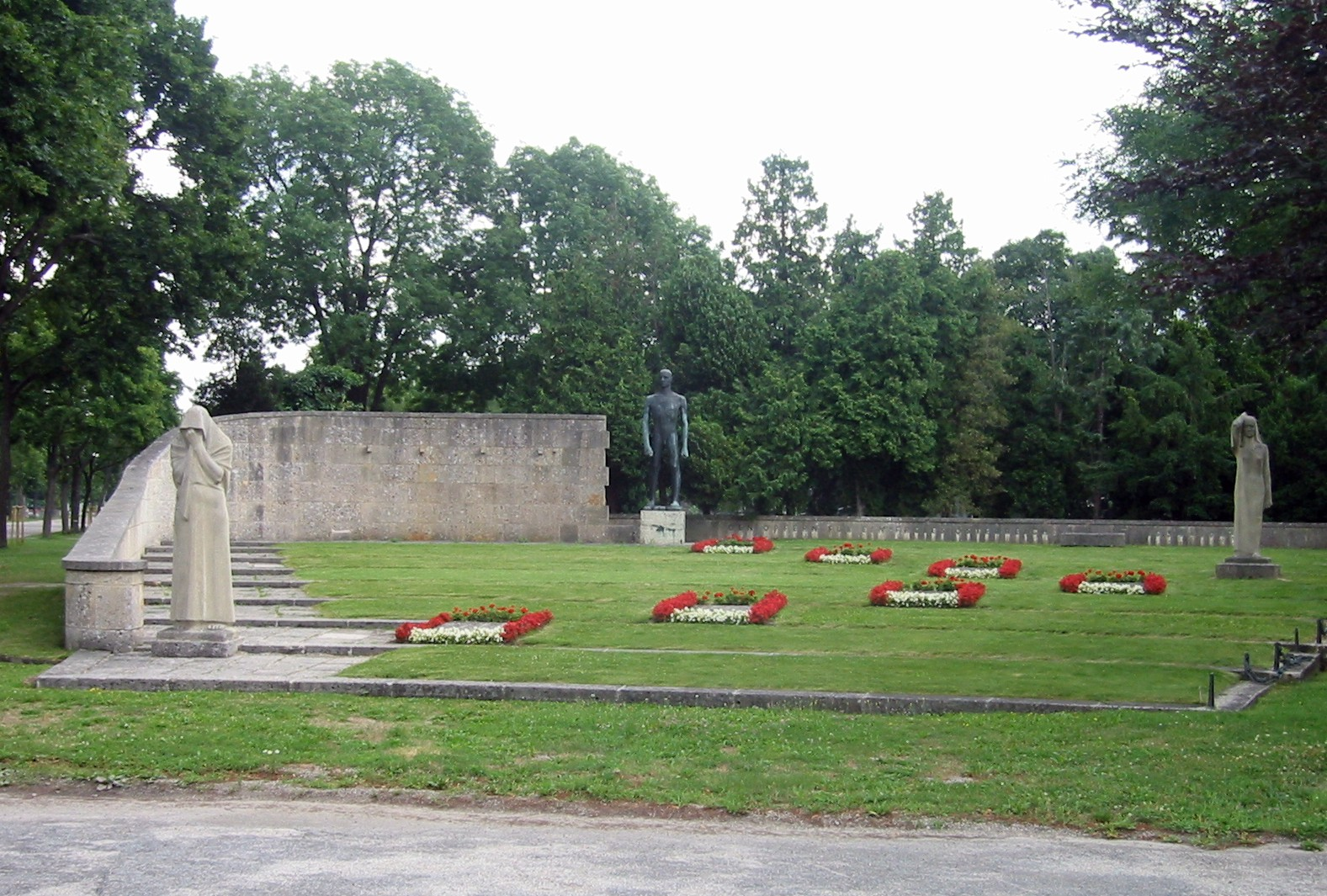
Memorial in the City of Vienna at the Central Cemetery

The Vienna City Memorial is a memorial located at the Vienna Central Cemetery and dedicated to "the victims for a free Austria 1934–1945". It was donated by the City of Vienna, designed by Fritz Cremer, Wilhelm Schütte and Margarete Schütte-Lihotzky and handed over to the public by Mayor Theodor Körner on 1 November 1948.

== Dedication ==
The monument consists of three statues by Fritz Cremer, seven floor slabs and a brick round arch. The first of the seven floor slabs is dedicated to the victims of Austrofascism (1934–1938), the second to sixth to the victims of one year of the Nazi regime, the seventh and last to the victims of 1944 and 1945.

The dedication explicitly refers to both authoritarian systems that had oppressed and terrorized Austria's population for twelve years: the Ständestaat (1933–1938), which was oriented towards fascist ideas, and Adolf Hitler's National Socialist terror regime, which was dominated by racial madness and expansionism. The Arbeiter-Zeitung explicitly wrote of a dedication for the victims who "fell between 1934 and 1945 in the struggle for a free Austria" and named the first victims Georg Weissel, Koloman Wallisch, Karl Münichreiter and Emil Swoboda, all of whom were Social Democratic leaders of the February Uprising. Although the indignation of Social Democracy at the brutality of the Patriotic Front is understandable, equality between the two regimes does not seem historically legitimate. Although the Dollfuß/Schuschnigg dictatorship caused political deaths in the three-figure range, the National Socialists committed mass murder and industrial extermination of more than 106,900 innocent Austrians, from infants to the elderly: approximately 65,000 Jewish citizens of Austria fell victim to the Holocaust, 9,000 Roma and Sinti from Porajmos, about 25,000 to Nazi medical crime, more than 7,000 to the persecution of political dissidents and in addition more than 900 to the persecution by the Nazi military justice. In total, around 9 million people were murdered in the Holocaust. This list does not include the same-sex oriented people, the so-called asocials and Jehovah's Witnesses, who were also persecuted in concentration camps and murdered.

The dedication of the memorial is ambiguous: The name implies all victim groups, the subtitle "To the victims for a free Austria" reduces the target group to only those who actively resisted. However, most of the victims of the Holocaust, Porajmos, eugenics, gay and religious persecution were unable to resist. Therefore, it is not surprising that most of the victim groups did not feel represented in this monument and that in the course of the turn of the 20th century to the 21st century the erection of further memorials was demanded. After the zero hour it was a special concern of the founders of the Second Republic and their victim myth to commemorate "the pioneers of a free Austria", especially since the existence of a considerable inner-Austrian resistance against National Socialism was expressly mentioned in the Moscow Declaration of 1943 as a precondition for the restoration of Austria's state sovereignty.

The donor of the monument is the City of Vienna, which is why it is also called the Memorial of the City of Vienna. The monument can be found in the Vienna Central Cemetery, Gate 2, Group 41, Rundplatz. The official address is Simmeringer Hauptstraße 234 in Vienna-Simmering.

== Construction, design, opening ==
On October 30, 1945, the Vienna City Senate decided to erect a monument of the City of Vienna for the "fallen in the fight against Nazi fascism and for a free, independent Austria", which was originally to be erected in the city center. On the other hand, the Communist Party of Austria (KPÖ) wanted to erect a monument to its members murdered by the Nazi regime at the Central Cemetery and announced its own competition, which Ernst Plojhar won. In October 1946, the Vienna Communist Party applied to the City Senate for the land at the Central Cemetery to be given to the City Senate for its monument. After the Communists had attained only 7.9 percent in the state and municipal elections on 25 November 1945, while the Social Democratic Party of Austria (SPÖ) had a sovereign majority of 57.18 percent, the effectiveness of the Communists was essentially extinguished.

On 18 December 1946, the Vienna City Planning Office announced a competition for a monument to the Nazi victims at the Central Cemetery, in which Fritz Cremer, Mario Petrucci and Fritz Wotruba took part, as well as Karl Stemolak, who later resigned. The jury consisted of Deputy Mayor Paul Speiser, three city councillors, two visual artists, two senior civil servants of the City Planning Office, and three representatives of the State Association of Politically Persecuted Persons. The committee unanimously supported the Red Circle design, which had been submitted by the German sculptor and communist Fritz Cremer and the Austrian architects Wilhelm Schütte and Margarete Schütte-Lihotzky, both KPÖ members. Therefore the Communists were reassured, but an independent KPÖ monument was averted.

The foundation stone was laid on 1 November 1947 by the then Mayor Theodor Körner, the later Federal President of the Republic of Austria. The ceremonial unveiling of the memorial took place on 1 November 1948, again by Körner. The musical framework of the ceremony was provided by a trumpet choir of the City of Vienna and the Mens Choir of the Municipal Tramway Association with the participation of four brass players from the Municipal Tramway Chapel.
