= Maria Poliakova =

Maria Poliakova/Polyakova may refer to:

- Maria Josefovna Poliakova (1908-1995), Soviet Jewish military officer and WWII spy (Rote Drei)
- Maria Polyakova (born 1997), Russian sportswoman, diver
