= Rudolf Leuzinger =

Swiss cartographer and lithographer (1826–1896)

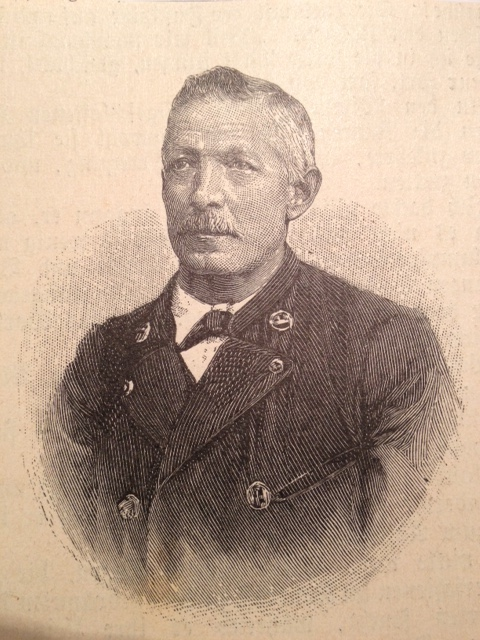
Rudolf Leuzinger (1826–1896)

Rudolf Leuzinger (Netstal, December 17, 1826 - Mollis, January 11, 1896) was a Swiss cartographer. He is known as one of the most prolific cartographers in Switzerland and one of the best interpreters of mountain landscapes and geologic forms. Leuzinger was also the first to produce terrain maps in color lithography. His more than 300 maps are a rare combination of accuracy, scientific thoroughness and artistry and earned him several national and international honors.

== Life ==
Rudolf Leuzinger was the son of master carpenter Jacob Leuzinger and Barbara Weber. As a young orphan, he grew up in the ‘Linthkolonie’, an educational institution for poor children and orphans near Ziegelbrücke, Canton of Glarus. In 1851 he married Barbara Trümpi (1828–1859) in 1859 he married her sister Rosina Trümpi (1838–1910). Leuzinger died at the age of 69 from heart failure.

== Work ==
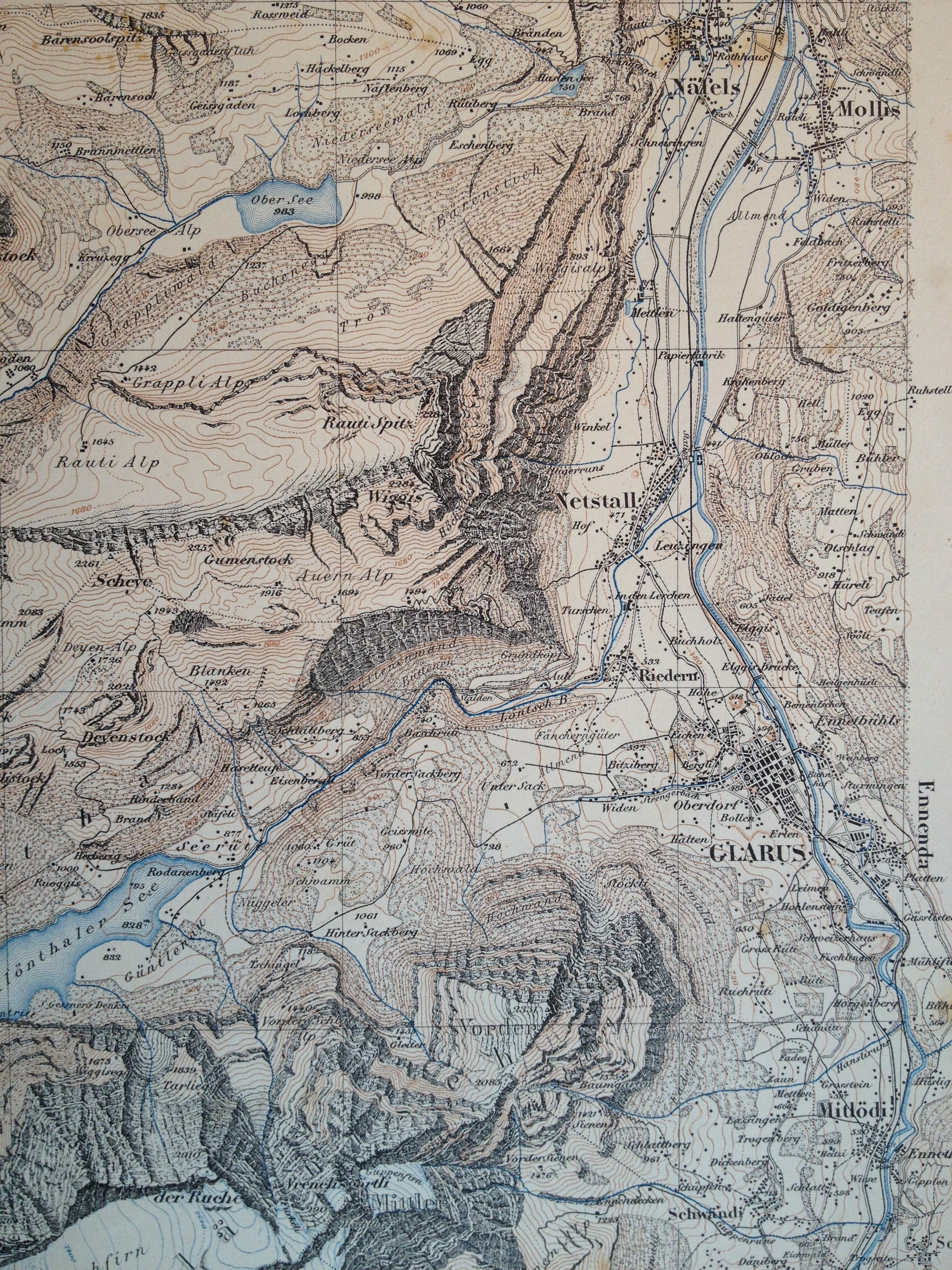
Fragment of map 263 "Glarus", Topographic Atlas of Switzerland - aka Siegfried Map - 1st edition 1879, lithography by Rudolf Leuzinger

In 1844 after a brief apprenticeship with a stonemason in Wädenswil, Leuzinger started as an apprentice at the lithographic section of the geographic institute Wurster & Comp. in Winterthur which at the time was led by the cartographer Jacob Melchior Ziegler. After completing his apprenticeship, he worked for several years as a cartographer on the topographical maps of the Canton of St. Gallen and Canton of Appenzell (16 sheets, 1849–1851), the Atlas of all Continents (1851), the hypsometric Atlas (1856) and the topographic map of the island of Madeira (1856). Own work from that period concerns maps of the Canton of St. Gallen, Canton of Ticino, Canton of Graubünden, Canton of Glarus and Canton of Freiburg as well as a map of the island of Sumbawa.

After 15 years at Wurster's, Leuzinger founded his own cartographic and lithographic institute in the city of Glarus in 1859. It soon became known for its scientifically and technically valuable productions, including map engraving. It so happened that in 1860 Leuzinger was commissioned by Emperor Napoleon III to produce some maps for his "Histoire de Jules César" in Paris. In 1861 he accepted the invitation of the Berne cantonal government to come work for the cantonal forestry and construction directorate (kantonal Forst- und Baudirektion) in Bern. Here he produced several school maps, tourist maps and maps as attachments to a number of scientific works.

A new work field presented itself in 1863 as the newly established Swiss Alpine Club decided to issue yearbooks including maps. Many of these tour maps were engraved by Leuzinger and hence almost all volumes contained work by his hand. Because the tour maps were often based on the original geodesic recording by the Federal Topographical Bureau (Eidgenössisches Topographisches Bureau), Leuzinger developed a close relationship with this organisation, in particular with Colonel Hermann Siegfried. When in 1868 the Federal Parliament (Bundesversammlung) decided to issue a new Topographic Atlas of Switzerland, Siegfried commissioned Leuzinger to do the difficult engravings of the mountains – based on the original maps of Dufour and Siegfried himself. Leuzinger then made no less than 117 monochrome engravings for which he was lauded both in Switzerland and abroad. He also made many other maps, partly in copper engraving, partly in chromolithography, highlights being some maps of Switzerland, maps of the Canton of Neuchâtel Canton of Bern and Canton of Aargau, special maps of Central Switzerland, Bernese Oberland, Grindelwald area and the mountain Rigi as well as a large map of France.

As off 1881 he continued his work from Haltli and then as off 1891 from "Ober-Haltli" in Mollis in his native Canton of Glarus. This period includes his terrain maps of Switzerland, South-Bavaria, Tyrol and Salzburg and Palestine, a travel map of Northern Italy, a railway map of Europe in 6 sheets, numerous small maps for Baedeker's and Meyer's travel guides and the terrain indications for Imfeld's famous Mont Blanc-map.

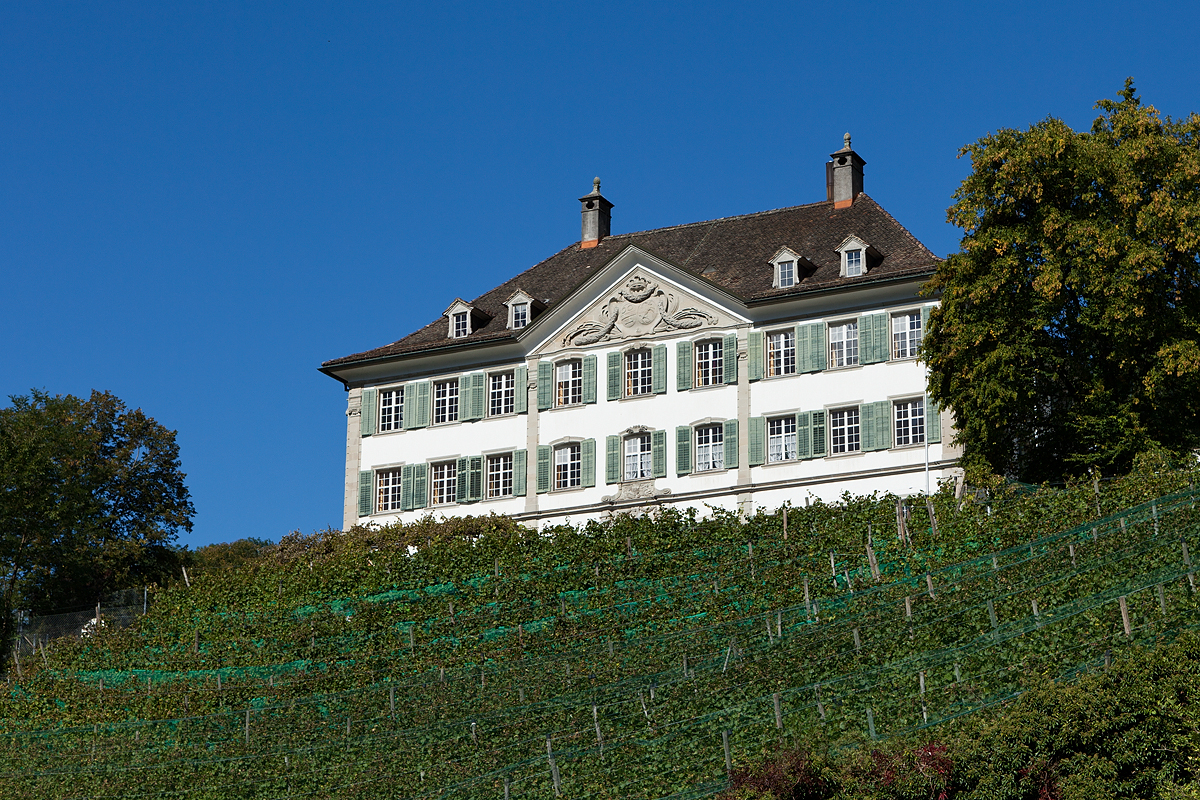
"Haltli" in Mollis

== Trivia ==
Through marriage of his daughter Rosina Susanna in 1876, Leuzinger became the father in law of Eduard Rubin, Swiss Colonel and the inventor of the full metal jacket bullet and military Schmidt-Rubin rifles.
