= Alexander Radó =

Hungarian cartographer, Communist activist, spy

Sándor Radó FRGS
- Born: Sándor Radó; 5 November 1899; Újpest, Austria-Hungary
- Died: 20 August 1981 (aged 81); Budapest, Hungary
- Occupations: Geographer; Soviet military intelligence agent; Red Orchestra; Red Three

Alexander Radó (also Alexander Radolfi, Sándor Kálmán Reich, Alexander Rado; born Sándor Radó, Hungarian: [ˈʃaːndor ˈrɒdoː]; 5 November 1899 – 20 August 1981) was a Hungarian cartographer who later became a Soviet military intelligence-agent in World War II. Radó was born into a middle class Jewish family in Újpest (now part of Budapest). He attended school in Budapest, before being drafted into the Austro-Hungarian army in 1917, where he became a radicalised communist. He was involved in communist regime in Hungary until it fell in 1919 and needed to flee to Austria. In 1921, he attended the third congress of the Communist International ("Comintern") in Moscow.

In 1922, he married Helene Jansen an ardent communist. In the same year the couple moved to Leipzig. He began working, creating maps for Meyers Lexikon publishers, joined the KPD and in 1923 took part in the failed German October uprising in Leipzig. In 1924, needing to leave the country, the couple moved to the Soviet Union to work at the All-Union Society for Cultural Contacts with Abroad. In 1925, the couple moved back to Berlin where Radó created the Geopress agency, a publisher of maps for newspapers and German companies like Lufthansa. In 1933, after the Reichstag Fire Decree, the KPD party was banned in Germany and the couple again had to flee, this time to Paris, where Radó established Inpress, an anti-Nazi press agency funded by the Soviet Union. At the same time he worked on projects for the Comintern. In 1936, the couple again moved, to Switzerland. From 1936 to 1945, he was devoted to running a Soviet military intelligence organisation known as the Red Three (German: Rote Drei) group, as a member of the resistance (German: Widerstandskämpfer) to Nazi Germany. His codename was "DORA".

After the war, Radó was extradited to the Soviet Union, tried on espionage charges and imprisoned for 10 years. Released in 1955, he returned to Budapest to find that his wife had divorced him. Wishing to move into academia but having no degree, he turned to his friends for political support to begin a new career as a cartographer, first working at the State Office of Land Survey and Cartography, then later a position at Cartographia, the Hungarian state mapping agency. In 1956, he was appointed as a lecturer at the Karl Marx University of Economic Sciences and by 1958 had taken over the Department of Economic Geography. In the 1950s and 1960s, Radó reformed Hungarian geography to suit the Soviet model of cartography. In the 1960s, his wartime role as a spy for the Red Three was discovered, making him a minor celebrity. In the late 1960s and 1970s, he continued to strengthen Hungarian cartography and attempted to purge all Hungarian geographers and cartographers who did not follow the Soviet line. In 1965, he began publishing Cartactual, a cartographic reference journal. During this period, he produced a number of signature maps including the Karta Mira atlas that was begun in 1964 and a special edition of Atlas International Larousse Politique et Economique in 1965. He died in 1981.

== Life ==
Radó was born into a middle-class Jewish family in Újpest, at the time an industrial suburb of Budapest. His father (née Gábor Reich) was first a clerk at a trading firm and later became a wealthy businessman through the ownership of a small timber works, a scrap dealer and a brewery. His mother was Malvina Rado. He had two siblings, a brother Ferenc Rado (Francis Radó) and a sister Erzsébet Klein (Elizabeth Klein) . As a six-year old, Radó was presented with a book about a trip to Japan on the Trans-Siberian Railway. The book contained a page that folded out into a map of the Russian Empire. The vision of the map made an indelible impression on Radó that began an interest in maps and mapmaking that would last his whole life. As a child, Radó attended school at a Budapest gymnasium and would travel to Italy and Austria for his summer holidays. While at school, he became interested in politics due to him witnessing, in 1912, the suppression of an unemployed workers demonstration by the police. During his teenage years, this developed into Radó becoming a devoted communist and he became part of a small socialist group that included Mátyás Rákosi and Ernő Gerő. Rákosi and Gerő would later become leading functionaries in the Hungarian Communist Party.

== Conscription ==
In 1917, Radó was drafted into the Austro-Hungarian army. His parents managed to use their influence to ensure Radó was posted as a junior staff officer in artillery and stationed at the barracks of Fortress Artillery in Budapest. During this time, he was able to continue his education by studying law as a correspondence student of the University of Budapest. At university, he was exposed to the revolutionary socialists during the revolution of 1918. The hostile debate expounded between the socialist and communists on how to end to war, lead to his increased radicalisation. His commanding officer, the brother of Zsigmond Kunfi who was anti-war, would later introduce Radó to the works of Marx and Lenin. After graduation at the officer candidate school in 1918, he was assigned to an artillery regiment and stationed in Budapest.

In December 1918, after the fall of Austro-Hungarian monarchy, Radó joined the Hungarian Communist Party (MKP). When the communists came to power in Hungary in March 1919 in Béla Kun's government, he was appointed as cartographer to the staff of 6th division of Hungarian Red Army, to draw maps. Ferenc Münnich, the political commissar of the division, then made him commissar of the 51st infantry regiment. Radó took an active part in fighting against Czechoslovak forces and in fighting against anti-Communist insurgents in Budapest. There is some uncertainty as to his movements at that point. One source states he moved to Germany in the autumn of 1919 to study geography and cartography, while another states he remained in Austria, where he established the ROSTO-Vienna news agency.

== Geographer ==
After the fall of the communist regime in Hungary and the White Terror in full swing with an established anti-Semitic tendency, Radó decided to flee to Austria arriving in Vienna on 1 September 1919. There is some uncertainty as to the movements of Radó after he left Vienna. According to a CIA report created in 1968 by Louis Thomas, Radó left Vienna to travel to Jena in Germany, in the late autumn of 1919, to matriculate at the University of Jena, initially to study law but later moved to study geography and cartography. The CIA report also claims that Radó left Germany at the end of 1919 with the help of his friends Rosa Luxemburg and Karl Liebknecht, to travel to Moscow to volunteer for the Comintern. While there, he got to know Comintern president Grigory Zinoviev. According to the report, the Comintern recruited Radó to take charge of a Soviet intelligence station that was located in the port city of Haparanda, located at the head of the Gulf of Bothnia, long considered a strategic location as the gateway for those needing to enter or leave Soviet Russia. Both Heffernan and Győri states these claims should be treated with caution, as there is no record of Radó matriculating at the University of Jena during 1919. Instead they believe that Radó spent the year of 1919 in Vienna, writing on military matters for a German-language Vienna based journal, Kommunismus: Zeitschrift der Kommunistischen Internationale für die Länder Südosteuropas (Communism: Journal of the Communist International for the Countries of Southeastern Europe), published by the Comintern. (Note: However, it is currently impossible to verify Heffernan and Győr position. What is known was that the Rote Drei, a component of the Rote Kapelle was comprehensively investigated by both British and American intelligence in the months after the war and the first report was produced in June 1945. This included a comprehensive set of biographies on the members associated the Rote Kapelle and Rote Drei, including Radó, which is reflected in the information content found in the Thomas report. It is worth noting that Kesaris qualifies the period slightly differently and doesn't mention the Soviet intelligence operation in Haparanda.)

In early 1920, Radó learned through a contact, that Radio Vienna was receiving dispatches from Moscow Commisariat of Foreign Affairs (NKID). The broadcasts consisted of propaganda from Soviet Russia. Radó contacted Maxim Litvinov, the director of the NKID, who supplied 10000 Swedish krona that enabled Radó to buy the dispatches. In July 1920, he used the remaining money to establish a news agency, known as ROSTO-Vienna (Rossifskoie Telegrafsnoie Agentur) in Vienna, that he ran until 1922. His colleagues at the agency helped him translate the dispatches into every European language. These included the writer and translator Xaver Schaffgotsch and the Marxist philosopher György Lukács. ROSTO-Vienna became the principal conduit into which Soviet news was channelled into Europe. By mid 1921 it was regularly receiving copies of Pravda, Izvestia, Lenin's speeches, gramophone recordings of speeches and other materials. Radó established contacts with several socialist and communist journalists in the west, that enabled the information bulletins from these materials to be distributed to left-wing newspapers and organizations in various countries. Amongst these was Zsigmond Kunfi from the Vienna newspaper Arbeiter-Zeitung, Konstantin Umansky, Charles Reber of L'Humanité and Frederick Kuh of the Chicago Sun-Times.

== Comintern ==
In July 1921, through the influence of his friends that he met in Germany, Rosa Luxemburg and Karl Liebknecht, he was brought to Moscow as the ROSTO delegate, to attend the third congress of the secretariat of Communist International ("Comintern") during July–July 1921. When he finally reached the Soviet border at Sebezh after the long trip, he described experience of crossing as "a moment of deep emotion. For the first time since the fall of the Hungarian Soviet Republic, he felt at home". While there, Radó spent several nights at the Moscow State Circus with Vladimir Mayakovsky, interviewed "The People's Commissar For Foreign Affairs", Georgy Chicherin and met Comintern president Grigory Zinoviev On one occasion, he was flabbergasted to be sitting close to Vladimir Lenin, describing Lenin's oratory as having an "electrifying effect" on him. Radó later claimed to have a conversation with Lenin during the Congress, when he explained the importance of political cartography. He described how anti-Hungarian lobbyists had used thematic maps to ensure that more than 70% of Hungarary's pre-war territory was ceded to the other nation-states after the Treaty of Trianon. Radó well understood the transformative and propaganda effects of cartography and believed it should be used by Soviet Russia to bring about world revolution. While in Moscow, he met and began a relationship with Helene Jansen ("Lena"), a secretary who was then working in the office pool of Lenin's office. An ardent communist and Communist Party of Germany (KPD) member, he had first met her in Vienna where she had worked in the secretive Balkans office of the Comintern. Helene's brother-in-law was Hermann Scherchen, a German conductor.

== University ==
In 1922, Radó returned to Germany. In the summer, he and Helene moved into together. The couple married the following year. The normalisation of diplomatic ties between Austria and the Soviet Union meant that ROSTO-Vienna was no longer needed and it was closed down in 1922. Radó returned to his studies in the same year, first attending Jena starting in late 1922 and then at Leipzig but never graduated. During his student days, he published his first map on the Polish–Soviet War of 1920-1921, in a Viennese communist journal. As he only partially completed his education, he was lucky to attain a position as a draughtsman with the Leipzig publisher Meyers Lexikon who had been publishing an encyclopedia in various editions since 1839.

On 23 October 1923, he took part in the preparation for a Comintern-planned large armed uprising in Germany, known as German October. As a prominent KPD member, he was made military chief of the communist forces in Leipzig. But the badly planned revolution had to be aborted at the last moment. He was briefly arrested for his efforts.

By 1924, Radó had sufficient knowledge to able to create his own maps. He created a civilian map of the Soviet Union on a 1:4million scale that included transport networks that he published with Westermann Verlag in January 1924. Fearing arrest from the uprising, Radó left Germany for the Soviet Union in September 1924. (Note: Sources vary. Both Schneider and Török agree that it is September 1924 he moved to Moscow, while Heffernan and Győri state it was spring of 1925. Both Schneider and Török align with Radó's own dates in his biography.) In Moscow, he worked for the All-Union Society for Cultural Contacts with Abroad (VOKS), located at the World Economy Institute of the Communist Academy. He was commissioned to create a guidebook for drivers of the Soviet Union, which involved flying across the country to record details. It was first published in 1925 in German and English. Before returning to Germany, he was approached by representatives of TASS to start a new news agency in Berlin.

In August 1925, the couple had their first son, Imre, named in honour of Radó's friend, the Hungarian politician Imre Sállai who was later murdered.

== Berlin life ==
When the couple returned to Berlin in 1926, they settled in an apartment located in the Hufeisensiedlung housing scheme. In Berlin, Radó was assigned to a Soviet intelligence network that collected information on German politics and German industrial development.

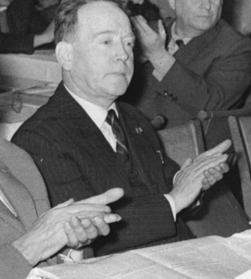
The Dada artist John Heartfield created much of the art work for Radó's atlas

Their close friends were Dadist illustrator John Heartfield (born Helmut Herzfeld) and his wife Getrude Fliess who was known as "Tutti". Heartfield was the inventor of photomontage and used the technique to become the demiurge of anti-Nazi propaganda. Fliess was a photographer and portraitist.

1932 brochure for the MASCH school in Berlin

Lena, who was expecting their first child found work producing agitprop for the central committee, in the KPD headquarters at Karl Liebknecht's house, a position she held until the early 1930s. Radó initially worked on the Meyers Konversations-Lexikon before being commissioned to create aviation maps for Lufthansa. During the period, Radó established the Berlin cartographic agency Pressgeography full name Geopress Atlas Permanent, known as Geopress with the help of the Berlin based comintern propagandist Willi Münzenberg and the Workers International Relief. Münzenberg was part of a comintern cadre that produced a large number of communist publications that were vertically influential and covered all activities including political, cultural, financial as well as strategic, military and the police. The Comintern organisation were a highly controlled, direct products of the Soviet state that enabled Soviet security to move and work in the organisation as if they were at home.

Geopress produced maps for newspapers which the couple ran from their own apartment. To produce his maps, Radó practiced strategic intelligence collection of open information, which constituted as much as 95% of the material that the network needed. This involved processing of macro and micro economic data along with sociological and political overviews into a format that was acceptable in dispatches suitable for Soviet intelligence.

To supplement their income, Radó gave lectures at the Marxist Workers' School (MASCH), teaching economic geography, the history of the working class movement in Germany (Arbeitergeschichte) and imperialism. In 1928, Radó published the 2nd edition of the USSR guidebook in German, English and French languages, that contained many advertisements for restaurants, hotels and other tourist attractions in Soviet Russia.

In December 1929, Radó created the full colour "Atlas for Politics Economy Workers' Movement", ("Atlas für Politik Wirtschaft Arbeiterbewegung"), also known as the "Atlas of Imperialism" published by Verlag für Literatur und Politik, that can be considered his first main atlas. (described below) It was notable for the use of a Choropleth map that described capital flows of different types and how they were impacted during World War I. The communist slant in the maps production didn't seem to affect his employer, Lufthansa. In the early 1930s, Radó worked to provide charts for Aerotransport, a Scandinavian Lufthansa affiliate. In 1931, Radó visited the Soviet Union to be briefed, returning in 1932. When he returned to Berlin, he found work updating the Almanach de Gotha.

In June 1930, the couple had their second child named Alexander after Radó.

== Paris life ==
After the Nazis came to power in Germany in 1933, banned the KPD and arrested many communists after the Reichstag fire, the couple along with Münzenberg and most of their associates fled through Austria to Paris.

The couple with their two children, Imre and Sándor Jr., along with Lena's mother Oma, settled in an apartment at 24 Rue Du 11 November in Meudon, east of Paris. Radó established the Inpress for Independent Press Agency, an independent anti-Nazi press agency The company was funded by the Soviet Union government, which enabled the couple to lead a lavish lifestyle, in contrast to their hand-to-mouth existence in Berlin. The company, whose editorial board included himself, the translator and writer Vladimir Pozner and the writer Arthur Koestler, had offices located at Rue du Faubourg Saint-Honoré. The publishers would eventually employ 16 people, of which four or five were Soviet agents using the firm for cover.

To present a veneer of respectability and satisfy genuine intellectual curiosity, Radó began to develop an academic reputation by visiting geographers in the universities in Paris and in 1934, joined the Paris based Société de Géographie and the London based Royal Geographical Society. While Radó gave the surface appearance of academic respectability, his wife remained openly committed to communism. Lene Radó found work as a volunteer for the Comintern based World Committee Against War and Fascism charity that had been established by Münzenberg. She helped him gather and collate material to create the two Brown books. During this period, Radó travelled all over Europe, visiting London, Moscow, Stockholm, Helsinki and Oslo.

== Geneva life ==
In October 1935, during a visit to Moscow, Radó was approached by Artur Artuzov, deputy chief of Soviet military intelligence and by Semyon Uritsky, chief of Soviet military intelligence. Radó agreed to direct and expand a small Red Army intelligence unit in Switzerland with the main task of obtaining intelligence on Nazi Germany.

In May 1936, the Radós received permission to live in Switzerland. In May 1936, the whole family moved to Switzerland, part of a Soviet military espionage operation where he became chief rezident. They settled in a comfortable apartment at 113, rue de Lausanne, in central Geneva overlooking Lake Geneva. In August 1936, Radó founded yet another cartographic agency, Geo-presse using the remains of Inpress and again began a conversation with local academics to provide the veneer of respectability needed to remain under cover and to broaden his coverage of his products. Geopress became a much more profitable business for Radó than Inpress as the demand for maps and geographical data increased as the international situation worsened. He initially produced political maps but when the Spanish Civil War began, the business expanded by producing hundreds of detailed maps in multiple languages showing changes in the Republican and Nationalists military fronts as the war raged. The maps were distributed to publishers across the world.

In 1937, Radó visited Italy to collect intelligence about the Italian military support of the Francist forces in the Spanish civil war (sources vary). This intelligence was sent to Moscow through Paris Soviet military intelligence station. In 1938 Radó contacted Swiss journalist and agent Otto Pünter in Bern, who gave him military intelligence on Italy. On Italy's military support of Franco's forces he received material from "Gabel", a Yugoslav serving as Spanish Republican consul in Sushak, Yugoslavia and military intelligence on Germany from "Puasson", a German Social Democratic political emigrant living in Switzerland with sources in Germany. (Note: Radó in this biography makes the claim of receiving intelligence from the Italian fascist regime and the Wehrmacht, which is confirmed by Thomas of the CIA. However Heffernan and Győri state there was no independent evidence for it.)

In 1938, Rado pursued his academic interest by publishing The Atlas of To-day and To-morrow with Victor Gollancz. Marthe Rajchman, a Polish Jewish graphic artist was the main designer of the maps. The new atlas sold more than 5300 copies and generated more than £400 for Geopress.

== Espionage career ==
=== Pre-war ===
When Radó was originally sent to Switzerland, he had been instructed by Soviet military intelligence to build an espionage network, but by 1939, he still wasn't fully prepared.

=== Sub network ===
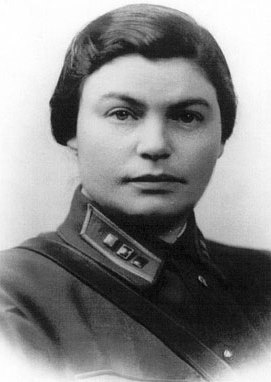
Radó's communications to the Soviet Union were received by his controller, Maria Josefovna Poliakova

Since 1936, a small Soviet cell existed in Switzerland, that had been established by Maria Josefovna Poliakova in early 1936 and left to German Ursula Kuczynski to run when Poliakova returned to the Soviet Union in the same year. The network had two principal agents. The first and most important was Polish immigrant Rachel Dübendorfer who worked as a secretary at the League of Nations International Labour Organization (ILO). She joined the network in 1934 to obtain information about production at Swiss army factories. The second agent was Swiss lawyer and journalist Otto Pünter who worked for the anti-fascist news agency International Socialist Agency (INSA). Pünter ran a clandestine network in Germany which generally supplied economic intelligence. When he'd arrived in Switzerland, Radó had assembled 50 separate sources of intelligence but none matched in quality to that supplied by Pünter. In April 1938, Radó made contact with Pünter who formally joined his network.

=== Recruitment ===
Through an intermediary, Léon Nicole who was general secretary of the Communist Party of Switzerland, Rado was able to formerly recruit several new people into his network. These included Margrit Bolli who became the third radio operator, who transmitted from her apartment in Lucerne and Edmond Hamel (assisted by his wife Olga Hamel), who would become the group's secondary radio operators. transmitting from their apartment in Geneva. These agents were compartmentalised, i.e. unknown to each other, except when they were man and wife, e.g. Bolli and Hamel and each had a codename which unknown to each other. In his radio communications, Radó used the codename "Dora", which was only known to Moscow Centre.

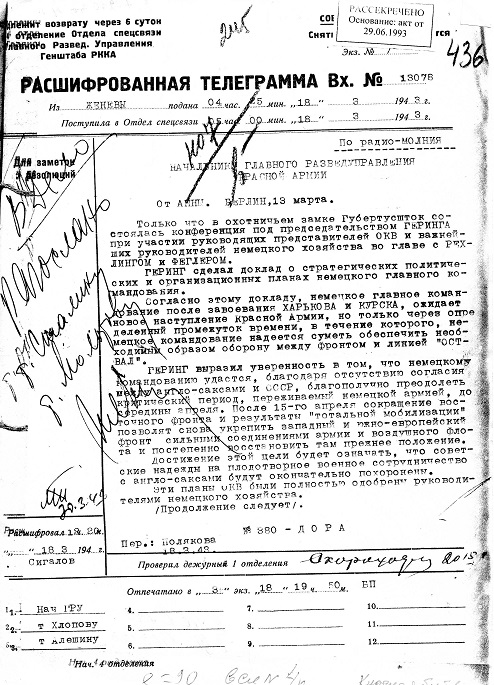
Report to the GRU by Dora about a meeting of leading German OKW and industry representatives, including Göring (chair), Röchling, and Vögler in Jagdhaus Hubertusstock, March 1943.

Between March and April 1940, Radó was visited by Anatoly Gurevich in a three-week business trip to Switzerland to deliver $3000 to finance the network along with cipher books necessary to encipher/decipher radio messages during transmission. In August 1940, Radó network was joined by Alexander Foote, an English Soviet agent in Switzerland who joined Ursula Kuczynski's network in October 1938. While he was attached to Kuczynski's network, Foote learned how to be a radio operator and by January 1940 was sufficiently competent to reach Moscow Centre. By March 1941, Foote was making regular radio transmissions with Moscow Centre from his apartment in Lausanne. When Kuczynski left for England in February 1941, Foote was assigned to Radó's network. Foote became the main radio operator for Radó's intelligence network and trained both Bolli and Hamel in radio use for less important radio transmissions. After the war, Foote grossly exaggerated his wartime role by claiming in his book Handbook for spies, that both he and Radó had separate networks of equal importance, with separate sub-sources. However the traffic report doesn't bear that claim. In May 1941, Dübendorfer and her network were formerly recruited into Radó's network. In October 1941, Georges Blun was recruited into the network.

=== Rote Drei ===
In the first half of 1941, a Swiss intelligence officer with the codename "Luiza", gave important information to Pünter (and Radó) that many divisions of the German Wehrmacht were being concentrated in the East. This warning of an imminent German attack, like that from Richard Sorge and from other Soviet agents, was dismissed by Stalin.

After the outbreak of the German-Soviet War on 22 June 1941, Radó's network continued to provide Soviet General Staff with very valuable intelligence on German forces. Some of it was supplied through Pünter by "Salter", whose identity has never been confirmed and by Blun a French intelligence officer who fled to Switzerland after the capitulation of France. Both had sources in Germany, among them Ernst Lemmer ("Agnessa"), editor of a German foreign policy bulletin.

In March 1942, a most valuable piece of intelligence was sent to Moscow: plans for summer German offensive aimed at the occupation of Caucasian oilfields, known as Case Blue. The operation was to begin on 31 May and run until 7 June 1942. Radó's network received the intelligence from Blun, provided by General Adolf Hamann, at the German OKW. Soviet command did not make proper use of this intelligence.

=== Lucy network ===
In the summer of 1942, Radó was able to recruit German political emigrant Rudolf Roessler, through Christian Schneider, a German lawyer and translator also worked in the ILO, who was friends with Dübendorfer. Roessler, apparently had extraordinary sources in Germany that he collected as part of the Lucy spy ring. He was able to provide a great quantity of high-quality intelligence, around 12,000 typed pages, (Note: Kamber estimates the actual quantity of reports at 6000 which were destroyed by being burnt in 1975. German cryptanalyst Willhelm F. Flicke (1897-1957) (later author) who worked at the OKW/Chi wireless intercept station in Lauf, estimated the number of messages sent at 5500, or around 5 a day for three years. Kesaris believes this estimate is reliable based on the number of messages recovered when Edmond and Olga Hamel were arrested.) sourced from the German High Command of planned operations on the Eastern Front, usually within a day of operational decisions being made. Later in the war, Roessler was able to provide the Soviet Union with intelligence on the V-1 and V-2 missiles.

On 12 December 1941, the Abwehr discovered Leopold Trepper's network in Belgium and gave it the moniker "Rote Kapelle". On 9 November 1942, Gurevich was arrested and during interrogation he exposed the existence of the Swiss network to the Abwehr who gave it the name "Rote Drei". They even obtained the radio cipher used by Radó's network which enabled them to decrypt some of Radó's radio communications. Meanwhile, Radó's network continued to supply Moscow Centre with valuable intelligence. In April 1943, Stalin received news about the planned German offensive near Kursk (provided by "Werther", a Roessler source in Germany).

=== Discovery ===
During the second half of 1943, the Germans persuaded Swiss authorities to act against Radó's network. On 11 September 1943, a Swiss Army radio counterintelligence company using radio direction-finding equipment notified the Federal Police that radio signals from the Geneva area could be detected, which resulted in the arrest of radio operators Margrit Bolli along with Edmond and Olga Hamel on the night 13 October 1943. Radó went into hiding. On 20 November 1943 Alexander Foote was arrested. On 19 April 1944, Christian Schneider along with Rachel Dübendorfer and her partner Paul Böttcher were arrested which resulted into Roessler's connection to Soviet intelligence being terminated. Rudolf Roessler was arrested on 19 May 1944.

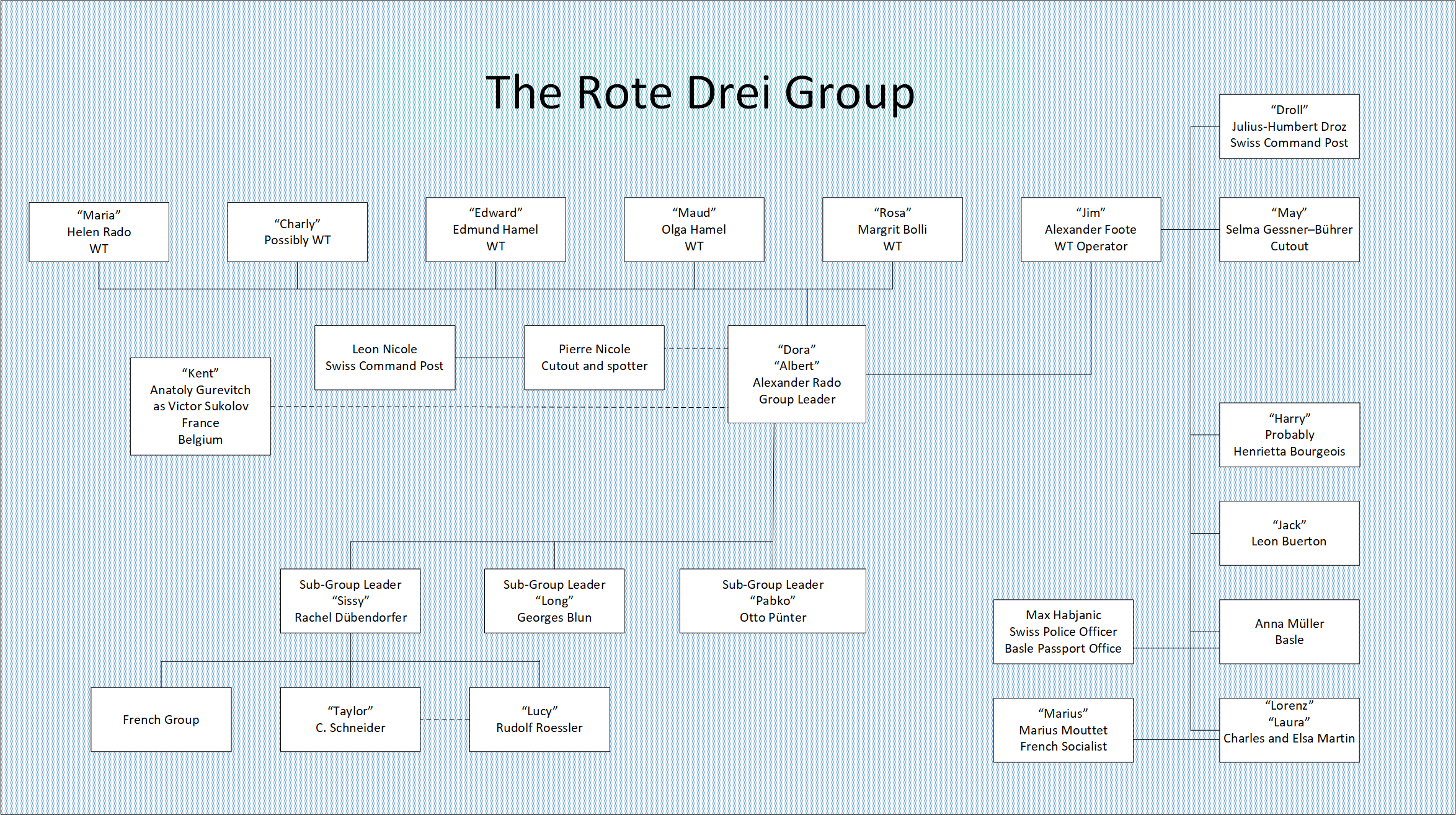
The organisation of the Rote Drei in Switzerland

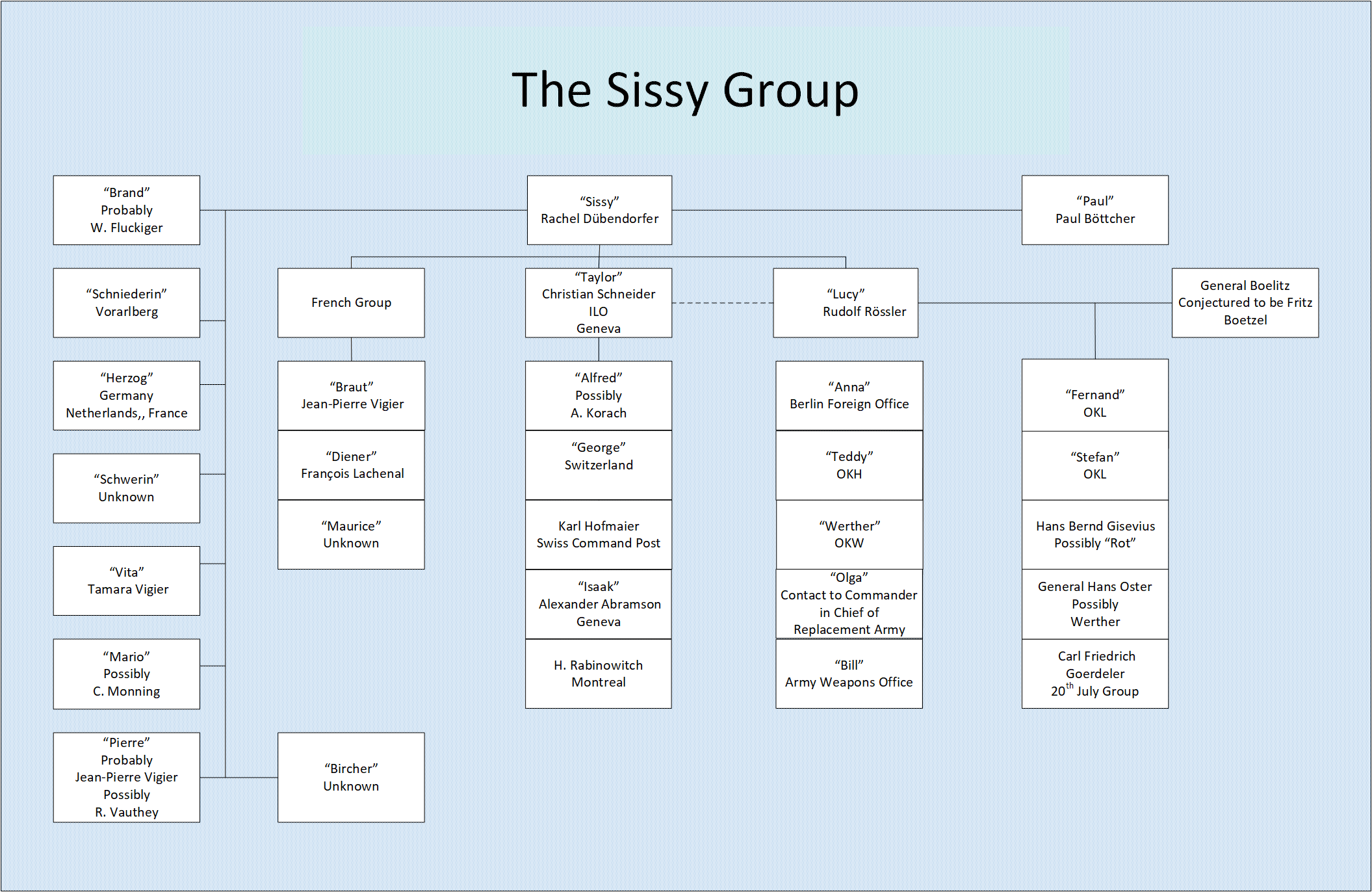
The organisation of the Sissy group in Switzerland, run by Rachel Dübendorfer. Roessler was part of the Sissy group.

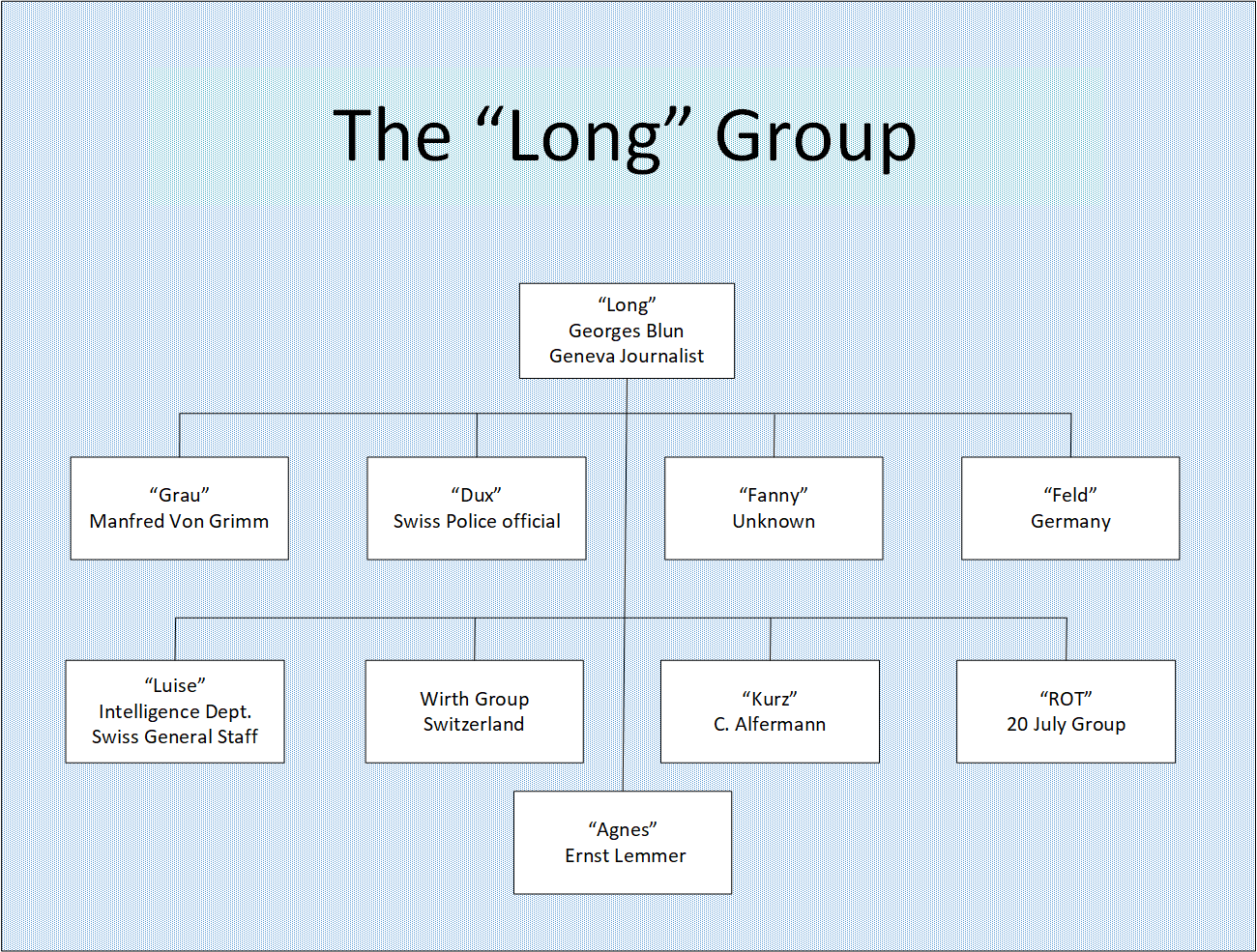
The organisation of the Long group in Switzerland, run by Georges Blun

The organisation of the Pakbo group in Switzerland run by Otto Pünter

=== Escape ===
On 16 September 1944, Radó and his wife Helen left their two children with her brother Hermann Scherchen, in whose home they had hidden, then illegally crossed the Swiss-French border on a French train with the help of the French Maquis from Upper Savoy. On 24 September, they reached Paris and settled in a house at 138, rue de Longchamp. At some point in November Radó was ordered to contact Soviet Red Army intelligence and it was suggested he return to Moscow as soon as possible, to explain what occurred with the Swiss organisation. On 6 January 1945, Radó along with 7 colleagues that included Trepper, Dübendorfer and Foote were evacuated via plane to the Soviet Union.

Due to military operations in Germany, a direct flight to the Soviet Union from Paris was impossible, so the plane flew over Northern Africa. Radó suspected his arrest on arrival in the Soviet Union after seeing Foote on the plane. Foote resented Radó's authority and it was likely he was going to expose Radó for financial mismanagement and corruption while working in Geneva. Using a stopover in Cairo, Radó escaped and managed to enter the British embassy under an alias. He applied for political asylum, but this was denied and Radó tried to commit suicide, but survived and was hospitalized. He was extradited by Egypt to the Soviet Union based on a false accusation, in August 1945 he was brought to Moscow under guard. In December 1946, he was sentenced by a Special Council of MGB without trial to 15 years imprisonment on espionage charges. Radó spent the next 10 years in prison including Lubyanka and Soviet labour camps Kuchino and at Ukhta.

== Release ==
Following the death of Stalin, Radó was released on 25 November 1954. In 1955, he was officially rehabilitated by the Military Collegium of the Supreme Court of the USSR, and was able to return to Hungary in July 1955 with the help of Ferenc Münnich and his old school friend Ernő Gerő. Radó returned to a country radically changed from when he left. Hungary was now a communist country and the academic system had now changed to reflect the Soviet model, that was based on Marxist–Leninist worldview. Geography as a science was particularly affected as it was seen by communists to have served the reactionary conservative-nationalist system of the previous government. Many leading geographers were forced to retire and the operations of the Hungarian Geographical Society (Magyar Földrajzi Társaság) were suspended.

When he returned, he was amazed and overjoyed to find his sister Erzsébet was alive and somehow escaped the Holocaust. In 1956, Radó was reunited with his wife, Lena, when he wrote to her in Paris, with the help of the Red Cross. He was unaware when they met in Budapest that his wife had divorced him, due to his incarceration in the labour camp, and that she was ill with cancer.

== Academia ==
Wishing to work in an academic capacity as a geographer, but with neither a university degree nor any business contacts within cartography, his new career could easily have foundered as his cartographic work for the Soviet Union was unknown in Hungary. However, he received strong political support from his friends that enabled his career to flourish relatively quickly. Radó was initially employed for a short time at the Ministry of Foreign Trade, then by 15 September 1955 was appointed as the head of division with the cartographic group established at the State Office of Land Survey and Cartography (ÁFTH), a position he held, until he retired in 1978. In January 1956, he was appointed the head engineer of Cartographia (Kartográfiai Vállalat), the state map and atlas publishing company. Radó held the position for three months until he was appointed chief editor from April 1956, an appointment he held until 1978. As head editor, he was able to exert complete control of Hungarian civilian mapping work until his retirement. The company, which was essentially moribund when he joined, lacking basic materials and instruments, began to flourish, producing two cartographic products, a "Hungarian National Atlas" and a series of atlases covering different regions.

=== Academic career ===
On 20 April 1956, Radó was elected an honorary fellow of the resurrected and ideologically compliant Hungarian Geographical Society, less than one year after he arrived back in Budapest. Radó never took part directly in the 1956 Hungarian Revolution, although the ÁFTH were planning to remove him. At one point, he believed he was capable of bringing together two opposing sides who were personal friends; Imre Nagy on one side and two Soviet generals on the other, but he was unable to facilitate a modus vivendi between the two. In the same year, Radó was appointed to a position at the Karl Marx University of Economic Sciences that was formerly taken by the Marxist geographer Markos György. György had been sacked by the Ministry of Education. as he was affiliated with an intellectual organisation that was associated with the 1956 revolution, making him politically unreliable. By 1 September 1958, Radó had completely taken over the Department of Economic Geography (Gazdaságföldrajzi Tanszék) as a self-styled Professor of Geography, despite a lack of dissertation or research that was commensurate with the position. His lack of qualifications was addressed on 22 September 1958, when the Hungarian Academy of Sciences awarded Radó the Doctor of Sciences degree (DSc), a Soviet era academic award that was considered the highest qualification on the scale. The granting of this qualification without doing any of the actual work to achieve it, was as shocking then as it would have been today and would not have been achievable without significant political support. The award caused both anger and shame within the geographers community and brought him into conflict with established academics, from before the Soviet takeover. According to the cartographer István Klinghammer "[he] blasted into local academic life in a typically ‘Stalinist’ manner. He insulted many and treated people unworthily, and hence gained many enemies". As he had the political support, any conflict that occurred in relation to Cartographia or indeed even with the Academy of Sciences, he invariably won, resulting in many academic colleagues being purged, with some staff forced to retire, others having their funding removed. The Hungarian cartographer György Kisari Balla who worked in the ÁFTH, stated, "We dreaded him. A good word from him meant a raise, a bad opinion a career change".

=== Soviet model ===
During the late 1950s to early 1960s Radó reformed Hungarian geography to adhere to the Soviet model. During this period he published heavily on articles espousing his admiration of Soviet political figures, for example Lenin, to essays on geomorphology and political geography. He focused particularly on economic geography as it could be subjected to the needs of Marxist–Leninist theory to support the belief that physical and human geography were separate academic disciplines, although closely related. Specifically, this was a rejection of environmental determinism and particularly the work of Alfred Hettner and Alfred Weber, as it failed to take into account Soviet modes of production.

He held the view, based on the official doctrine of Marxist–Leninist theory, that applied geography had primacy over theoretical geography. He stated in 1957, that "...Soviet Union geography provides one of the most important scientific bases for the construction of theory and the means by Soviet people can learn actively to transform their natural environment". He confirmed in 1962 that his ideas were a reflection of Nikita Khrushchev proposals to the 22nd Congress of the Communist Party of the Soviet Union in 1961, that the application of scientific principles could strengthen communist society. It implied that the role of geography was to provide the scientific basis for Soviet spatial planning, which was an entirely unoriginal idea.

=== Espionage career in academia ===
It is uncertain whether Radó continued his espionage activities after he entered academia in Budapest. In 1955, he told his son, that he refused both the Soviet and Hungarians offers of cooperation in establishing an intelligence service. However, the CIA believed this was untrue. Their experience of Radó's successful espionage career during the interwar period led them to believe that he would use his position in cartography to collect GIS information that would be important to the Soviet Union. Radó's career in the late 1950s and early 1960s had expanded to include attendance at several professional conferences abroad that were held several times a year and he also held positions in a number of international cartographic organisations. He also corresponded with many foreign partners in execution of his academic work, where he would request and receive GIS, cartographic and statistical data for various maps that he published. The CIA produced a report in 1968, where they described Radó as an important Soviet intelligence agent and his work was to collect the data for use by the Soviet Union. At the time the Americas warned many partner cartographic agencies in the west, that they should not cooperate with Radó.

=== Discovery ===
In 1960, Radó's wartime role as a spy for the Soviet Union was discovered by Swedish journalists and revealed to the attendees of the conference of the International Geographical Union in Stockholm, much to the dismay of the Hungarian attendees who were swarmed by reporters and that turned Radó into a celebrity . The Soviet KGB who were present as part of the Soviet delegation, were also acutely embarrassed as they had always denied the presence of Soviet agents in Europe. After the exposé, the Soviets and Hungarians tried to capitalise on the situation by attempting to present a myth of Radó as an anti-fascist hero of World War II. Over the next several years, speculation of the wartime career of Radó, along with the operations of the Rote Drei continued to appear and in particularly in 1963, when Kim Philby was exposed as a Soviet spy. In 1966, Pierre Accoce and Pierre Quet released a novel with the title: "A man called Lucy; 1939-1945" that was a full-length history of the Rote Drei. The authors argued that the intelligence provided by Rudolf Roessler was critical in ensuring the defeat of the Wehrmacht advance in 1942–1943. The publication led to further speculation that included a series of articles by Der Spiegel journalists on 16 January 1967 with the series title: "Verräter im Führerhauptquartier" (Traitors at the Führer's headquarters) along with the subsequent CIA reports on Radó in 1967 and the Rote Drei in the 1970s. The conclusions presented by the book and the article series were at odd with the official Soviet history of World War II, simply that the Wehrmacht had been defeated by ground forces of the Red Army and not German intelligence reports forwarded by Soviet agents and communist informers in Europe.

Radó was instructed by the Soviet KGB to disavow the conclusions espoused in the books and newspaper series. In 1967, the Soviets planned to produce a youth novel, a biography of Radó's wartime career in Switzerland, that was politically acceptable to them. The novel's message was to suggest that the defeat of Germany was due to the excellent Western intelligence agencies and not to the Soviet strategic effort. Instead Radó decided to write his own memoir "Dóra jelenti" (Codename Dóra) that was first published in Hungarian in 1971 . The book was censored by both the Soviet KGB and Hungarian intelligence with around 10% of the textual content of the book removed. The book was translated into 23 languages and became an "anti-fascist oratory". In 1978, a film of the book was made with the same title. In 2006, the original uncensored manuscript was published in Budapest.

=== Later career ===
Radó's career reached its peak in the second half of the 1960s and continued into the 1970s. During those years, he continued to strengthen Hungarian cartography, for example by creating new positions of employment in the industry and creating political forums for discussion, and by using his academic position to build relationships in the international geographic and cartographic communities. However, his career did face some setbacks. In 1966, he was forced to rescind his academic chair at the university, due to a new law that forbade state officials from holding more than one senior position. Radó choose to remain at the ÁFTH over his university chair. In 1967, his nomination for vice presidency of the IGU was rejected. Nor was he able to attain election to the Hungarian Academy of Sciences. He had approached György Aczél the doyen of communist science, with the assurance that he would be elected to the HAS, but Aczél refused to help him.

Throughout the later period of Radó's career, he continued his ideological campaign to purge all Hungarian geographers and cartographers who did not follow the Soviet line. In 1975, he wrote a polemic where he criticised several long-dead Hungarian cartographers and geographers, in an attempt to expunge them from history. He was particularly critical of Hungarian geographer Pál Teleki who was later prime minister of the Kingdom of Hungary (1920–1946). Radó took a particular dislike to Teleki's geography, calling it a "backward, obsolete scientific construction designed by its very essentials to propagate the ideology, ambitions, and bourgeois conceptions of the outdated socioeconomic system in which it was produced". In a visit to the Eötvös Loránd University, he requested that Teleki's portrait be removed from the Department of Geography. This was followed in 1979, by Radó blocking the Hungarian Geographical Society attempt to hold a conference to re-evaluate Teleki's work, that was to be held on the 100th anniversary of his birth. Radó stated "that everything has already been written about Teleki".

Radó was celebrated on his 80th birthday, by the Földrajzi Közlemények, the journal of the Hungarian Geographical Society when they wrote a feature on Radó that was published across two issues, to salute their president. A reception was held for his birthday at the Soviet embassy in Budapest. János Kádár, who was the General Secretary of the Hungarian Socialist Workers' Party was in attendance.

== Death ==
In 1980, a year before his death an unnamed CIA attaché asked Radó at a celebration of Bastille Day at the French ambassadors residence in Budapest, if they would ever know the real story of the Swiss Rote Kapelle network. Radó replied "...It is enough to know that I worked in a common cause with all those who were fighting Hitler—all of the accounts agree on this, if nothing else. I hope I will be remembered mostly for my contributions to geographical science".

When Radó died the Hungarian press and foreign geography and cartography journals commemorated him by publishing a necrologue. (Note: A list of formal obituaries for the record) He was described by Márton Pécsi, the next president of the geographical society, as "I knew him as someone for whom work, revolutionism, the striving for innovation, Marxist internationalism, and socialist patriotism together formed the essence of his life".

== Communist geography ==
=== Atlases ===
Radó produced a number of atlases with designs that ranged from detailing economics statistics, propaganda, geographics and as well as choropleth maps in both commercial and academic formats.

==== Atlas for Politics Economy Workers' Movement ====
In 1930, the first of three volumes of the Atlas for Politics Economy Workers' Movement was published by Radó in Germany. A year later, a Japanese version was published with the title Atlas für Wirtschaft Arbeiterbewegung. In a review in the International Affairs, the journal of Chatham House, the volume was described as "Marxist propaganda, anti-capitalist in aim...the author indulges in one wild extreme of fantasy depicting the Soviet Union as encircled". The subject of the creation of the atlas began with Radó in a conversation that he had with Vladimir Lenin, that places the atlas firmly within the idiom and the traditions of the Russian Revolution.

The atlas was presented across six chapters in black and white along with colour to represent political and economic developments between individual states. The Soviet Union was coloured in a bold red, similar to the old British cartography standard of red or pink that had been in use since the 19th century to emphasise the British Empire. Its use on the atlas was clearly for the same purpose, to show that the Soviet Union was claiming its own existence in direct competition with the old empires. To emphasise the size of the Soviet Union, Radó used the Mercator projection. Although far more than a propaganda tool, numerous maps in the series were used for propaganda purposes, for example showing the Soviet Union as isolated with titles like "The Isolation of the Soviet Union in Europe" or "The Armament for the Next War" showing the countries borders surrounded by heavily armed European and Asian countries. The naming of ethnic groups was an important aspect of the maps production in Soviet empire with many ethnic groups. On most maps, Radó uses the term "Soviet Union" except one "The Proletarian Great Power—The Soviet Union" where he takes cognizance of the Bolsheviks. This led to difficulties for Radó when the Bolsheviks lost power and led to an analysis of Soviet ethnic peoples that resulted in other Soviet maps being produced that began the enforcement of those people into the country of the Soviet Union, in a process known as Sovietization. Radó largely ignored ethnic groupings in his maps of the Soviet Union, instead showing the area as a monochromatic and homogeneous space. In contrast, in other areas of the world he documented the groupings, for example in maps of Europe and America, where he detailed the political divisions. The most interesting aspect of the atlas was the representation of the flows of capital and how they were impacted during World War I, using choropleth maps. These were likely the first maps that displayed capital flows. The front cover design and selection of font was by John Heartfield.

==== The Atlas of To-day and To-morrow ====
The second main atlas, created by Radó and Marthe Rajchman, was published in London in 1938 by Victor Gollancz, was of a smaller format, published across six chapters. It contained many more maps than the previous atlas and made extensive use of statistics to explain the detail. In a review in the International Affairs, the atlas was described as:

The compiler has set out to demonstrate how much information about the world today can be conveyed in maps and diagrams, eked out by a liberal amount of letterpress. Frontiers, trade relations, industrial development and distribution of races, incomes and constitutions are all shown in different sections. Some of these things lend themselves better than others to this treatment: but the only complete failure is with the forms of government, which altogether defy the rough-and-ready classifications of the cartographer. The arrogant title has already suffered its nemesis. Austria is shown as independent and Czechoslovakia as unpartitioned.

Two editions were published, one in English and one in German. The only difference between the two versions was that the English language maps were in black and white, in contrast to the German Atlas, which were in colour. Unlike the 1930 atlas, this new atlas presented the Soviet Union on an equal footing with other nations, politically, economically and militarily and was seen as no longer encircled. Several maps were included that showed the Soviet Union as globalized with good communications, trade and infrastructure links and these maps were favourably viewed by reviewers. Radó used the extensive statistics that he had available, to clearly delineate each ethnic republic and their population figures. However, in maps of the Soviet Union, the areas were shown as a homogeneous whole and drawn in a monochrome.

Radó's use of choropleth maps was much more advanced in his second main atlas, with many more maps showing capital flows of different types.

==== Karta Mira ====
The Karta Mira or World Map was an atlas that was begun by Radó in July 1964. The Soviet Union had used the 1-2,500,000 scale for their cartography since the 1930s and were familiar with its use. In 1956, the Soviet Union had approached the United Nations Economic and Social Council with a plan to produce a world map on the scale of 1:2,500,000, as they objected to the scale used on the International Map of the World at 1:1,000000, due to national security considerations. However, the plan was rejected by the United Nations. Radó managed to convince the Soviet Union and member countries of the communist block that the 1:2,500,000 scale was ideal and the smaller project was achievable. Radó had campaigned for better geographical maps in the communist bloc consisting of Hungary, German Democratic Republic, Soviet Union, Romania, Bulgaria, Poland and Czechoslovakia and particularly for production of topographical maps of cities that were so often kept secret, due to national security concerns.

Radó presented the first sheet of the map to the 20th Geographical Congress in London in July 1964. The map was constructed from 262 sheets, consisting of 224 normal sheets and 38 overlapping sheets. Radó began production of the map as director, when he held a series of editorial meetings, between 1963 and 1979, in different socialist countries. The other important member of the Hungarian delegation was Árpád Papp-Váry, who acted as Radó's deputy from 1973 onwards.

==== Atlas International Larousse Politique et Economique ====
In 1965, Radó produced a novel edition of a political and economic map in collaboration with French geographer, Ivan du Jonchay for the Larousse publishing house. The atlas was produced in three languages, French, English and Spanish with an index with 34,000 entries and a table of statistics with 310 tables.

=== Academic publishing ===
Radó's publishing career began after he returned from the Soviet Union in 1955. The first change to occur was in the Földméréstani Kozlemények (Periodical of Geodesy) journal, which had been printed from 1949. Its name was changed to Geodézia és Kartográfia (Geodesy and Kartography) after Radó joined the editorial board. In 1956, it was expanded with a new section called Változások a Térképen (Map Changes) that consisted of several pages of cartographic map changes garnered from both western and communist countries. In 1959, his title was changed to Coordinating Editor-Sandor Rado, Doctor of Geographic Science. In 1962, the publishing schedule of Geodézia és Kartográfia was increased from four to six issues a year, increasing the usefulness of the data to cartographers. However, as the data was published in Hungarian, it made the data of limited use.

Radó's most important contributions were in cartography, but he worked more as an organiser than a researcher. In 1957, he recruited a team of geographers and caertographists at the Karl Marx University of Economics along with people from the AFTH to create the "International Almanach" that was published by Cartographia. These were three huge volumes of basic statistical data, that were published in 1959, with two further updated editions produced in 1960 and 1967. In 1957, Radó launched the Terra Térképszolgálat ("Terra Map Service"), a new service from the AFTH that offered political maps, i.e. geographic background summaries on areas in the news, for newspapers and magazine. The project in essence was an extension of Geopress and continued production into the 1980s.

In September 1965, Radó began to publish the journal Cartactual, a quarterly journal that had the map legends written in English, German, French, and Hungarian language to suit an international audience. Each issue of Cartactual was essentially a collection of easy-to-reproduce maps that illustrated the more noteworthy map changes cited in Geodézia és Kartográfia.

== Awards and honours ==
Radó was the leading international representative of Hungarian geography who participated in all the leading international geographical conferences and bodies and was also known for his work as an intelligence agent. This made his name particularly well known both at home in Hungary and abroad and led to him accumulating many awards particularly from socialist countries but also from the west. Radó earned a total of 38 awards during his lifetime. Only the most important are included here.

=== Medals ===
Radó was awarded two civil awards from his home country. The first was in 1963, when Radó was awarded the Kossuth Prize from the Hungarian National Assembly. In 1970, he was awarded the State Award of the Hungarian People's Republic. He was also awarded several military decorations in Hungary, that included the Order of the Red Banner, the Order of Merit for a Socialist Homeland and the Order of Merit for the Order of Labor.

Radó received the Order of the Patriotic War from the Soviet Union. There is doubt whether Radó received the Order of Lenin. He was expecting to receive the award when he visited the Soviet Union in 1949, but he was summoned there for a completely different reason. However, two biographers claim that he received the award in 1942, while another claimed he received it in 1943. Radó in an interview himself stated that he did not receive the medal.

=== Societies ===
In November 1936, Radó was elected to the fellowship of the Royal Geographical Society. During the 1960s and 1970s, Radó was president of the Hungarian national commissions of the International Geographical Union (IGU) and the International Cartographic Association (ICA). In 1972, he was elected to the chair of the ICA commission on thematic maps. During the following year, he was elected as president of the Hungarian Geographical Society (Magyar Földrajzi Társaság). In 1977, he was awarded an honorary doctorate from the Lomonosov University.

In 1987, the Military Cartographic Services of the GDR in Halle was renamed to Militärkartogrfischer Dienst (VEB) "Sandor Rado" to honour Radó.

== Publications ==
The following are Radó's main geographic and cartographic publications:

- Radó, Alexander, ed. (1925). Führer durch die Sowjetunion [Guide to the Soviet Union] (in German). Moscow: Staatsverlag der RSFSR.
- Radó, Alexander, ed. (1928a). Führer durch die Sowjettnion - Gesanmtausgabe (in German). Berlin: Berlin Neuer Deutscher Verlag.
- Radó, Alexander, ed. (1928b). Guide à travers l'Union Soviétique: Edition Complete (Société pour les relations culturelles entre l'USSR et l'étranger) (in German). Berlin: Berlin Neuer Deutscher Verlag.
- Radó, Alexander (1930). Atlas für Politik, Wirtschaft, Arbeiterbewegung [Atlas for politics, economics, labor movement] (in German). Wien: Verlag für Literatur und Politik.
- Radó, Alexander (1938). The Atlas of To-day and To-morrow. London: Victor Gollancz.

The following are Radó's other geographic and cartographic publications:

- Radó, Alexander (1924). Politische und Verkehrskarte der Sowjetrepubliken [Political and transport map of the Soviet republics] (in German). Braunschweig: G. Westermann. "Completed after. As of January 1, 1924"
- Radó, Alexander (1929). Gross-Hamburg. Berlin: Neuer Deutscher Verlag.
- Radó, Alexander (1933). Europäisches Russland und [die] Randstaaten [European Russia and [the] peripheral states] (in German). Georg Westermann Verlag. ISBN 978-9949-096-05-3.
- Radó, Sándor, ed. (1962). Welthandbuch; Internationaler politischer und wirtschaftlicher Almanach [World Handbook: International political and economic almanac]. Budape: Corvina Verlagst.
- Magyarország autóatlasza [Car atlas of Hungary]. Budapest: Cartographia. 1979. ISBN 9789633501573.
- Radó, Alexander (1979). Donauknie und Umgebung : Reiseführer und Atlas [Danube Bend and surroundings: travel guide and atlas] (in German). Budapest: Kartográfiai Vállalat.

The following is the autobiography:

- Radó, Sándor (1973). Под псевдонимом Дора: Воспоминания сов. разведчика (in Russian). Voenizdat.
  - Radó, Alexander (1974). "Dora meldet" – Buch gebraucht, antiquarisch & neu kaufen (in German) (1st ed.). Berlin: Militärverlag der DDR.
  - Radó, Sándor (1977). Codename Dora. London: Abelard. ISBN 9780200723398.

The following is Alexander Foote's book in which he grossly exaggerated his wartime role, claiming that he ran his own espionage network with own sources:

- Foote, Alexander (1949). Handbook for Spies. New York: Hillman Periodicals. OCLC 11566951.

== See also ==
- People of the Red Orchestra
- Red Orchestra
