= Cartactual =

Hungarian geographical journal

Cartactual was a cartographic reference journal, published by Hungarian publisher Cartographia, starting in September 1965 under the editorship of Alexander Radó. It produced a collection of maps that illustrated changes to geographic features such as roads, railways, ferry routes, ports, and international and sub-national boundaries in various countries of the world, that were cited in its sister-journal Geodézia és Kartográfia (Geodesy and Cartography).

== Production ==
Cartactual was created wholly from open source cartography and was an amalgamation of many newspapers and technical journals. Its production represented a significant technical task that covered search, selection, organisation, illustration and publication of known data by Cartographia cartographers.

== Publication ==
It was initially published quarterly before becoming bi-monthly in 1981. The journals map legends were written in English, German, French, and Hungarian language editions to suit an international audience of some 600 subscribers that included map publishers, libraries and universities and consisted of 12-14 A3 sized maps per edition. Its success made it an international standard, until the mid-1980s when the publishing environment changed due to the economic crisis's in socialist countries that increased costs for production and reduced subscriber numbers. It started to lengthen the time between its publication dates, and continued to be produced until 1993 when it finally ceased operations. In total, 158 issues were produced.

In 1971, Cartactual was extended together with an associated textual journal "Cartinform" that included cartobibliographic information, short reviews of current geographical and cartographic literature and map publications. It consisted of some 20-24 pages.
