= Cartography of Switzerland =

Sample detail of the 1:50,000 National Map of Switzerland, showing the Blüemlisalp glacier.

The cartography of Switzerland is the history of surveying and creation of maps of Switzerland. Switzerland has had its current boundaries since 1815, but maps of the Old Swiss Confederacy were drawn since the 16th century. The first topographical survey on a federal level began in 1809, resulting in the Topographic Map of Switzerland (German: Topographische Karte der Schweiz) or Dufour Map (German: Dufourkarte; French: Carte Dufour). From 1869 to 1901, this map was replaced by the Topographic Atlas of Switzerland (German: Topographischer Atlas der Schweiz) or Siegfried Map (German: Siegfriedkarte; French: Carte Siegfried).

From 1901, the Topographical Survey of Switzerland is an independent division within the military, introducing the Swiss coordinate system in 1903. The office is renamed as the Swiss Federal Office of Topography in 1979, with the swisstopo.ch website online since 1997.

== Old Swiss Confederacy ==
The first systematic geographical description of Switzerland is the Superioris Germaniae Confoederationis descriptio by Albert von Bonstetten (1479). The oldest map Old Swiss Confederacy is the one by Konrad Türst (d. 1503), physician in Zürich from 1489, made during 1495–1497. Trüst's map shows most of the territory of modern Switzerland (but excluding Basel and Geneva). On the margins is a coordinate grid in Arabic numerals, using Ptolemy's prime meridian of 20°W.

The first printed map of Switzerland is Tabula Nova Heremi Helvetiorum, published in the 1513 Strasbourg edition of Ptolemy. Numerous maps followed in the 16th century, notably those by Aegidius Tschudi (1538, 1560), Johannes Stumpf (1548), Sebastian Münster (c. 1550) and Abraham Ortelius (1570). Most of these early maps were oriented towards either the south or the east. The convention of orienting maps towards the north was gradually introduced beginning in the mid 16th-century (an early example being the 1555 map by Antonio Salamanca), but remained in use alongside the earlier conventions well into the 17th century. Tschudi gave his scale in the miliaria Helvetica ("Helvetic mile"), corresponding eight Italian miles.

In the 17th century, cartography progressed to the production of essentially modern topographic maps. Hans Conrad Gyger (1599–1674) by commission of the government of Zürich produced a detailed map of the canton of Zürich in an effort spanning four decades. Completed in 1667, the map showed the territory in shaded relief in hitherto unseen quality and detail, but because the map was classified as a military secret by the Zürich authorities, Gyger's work had limited influence on contemporary cartographers. Gyger also published a detailed map of Switzerland in 1657.

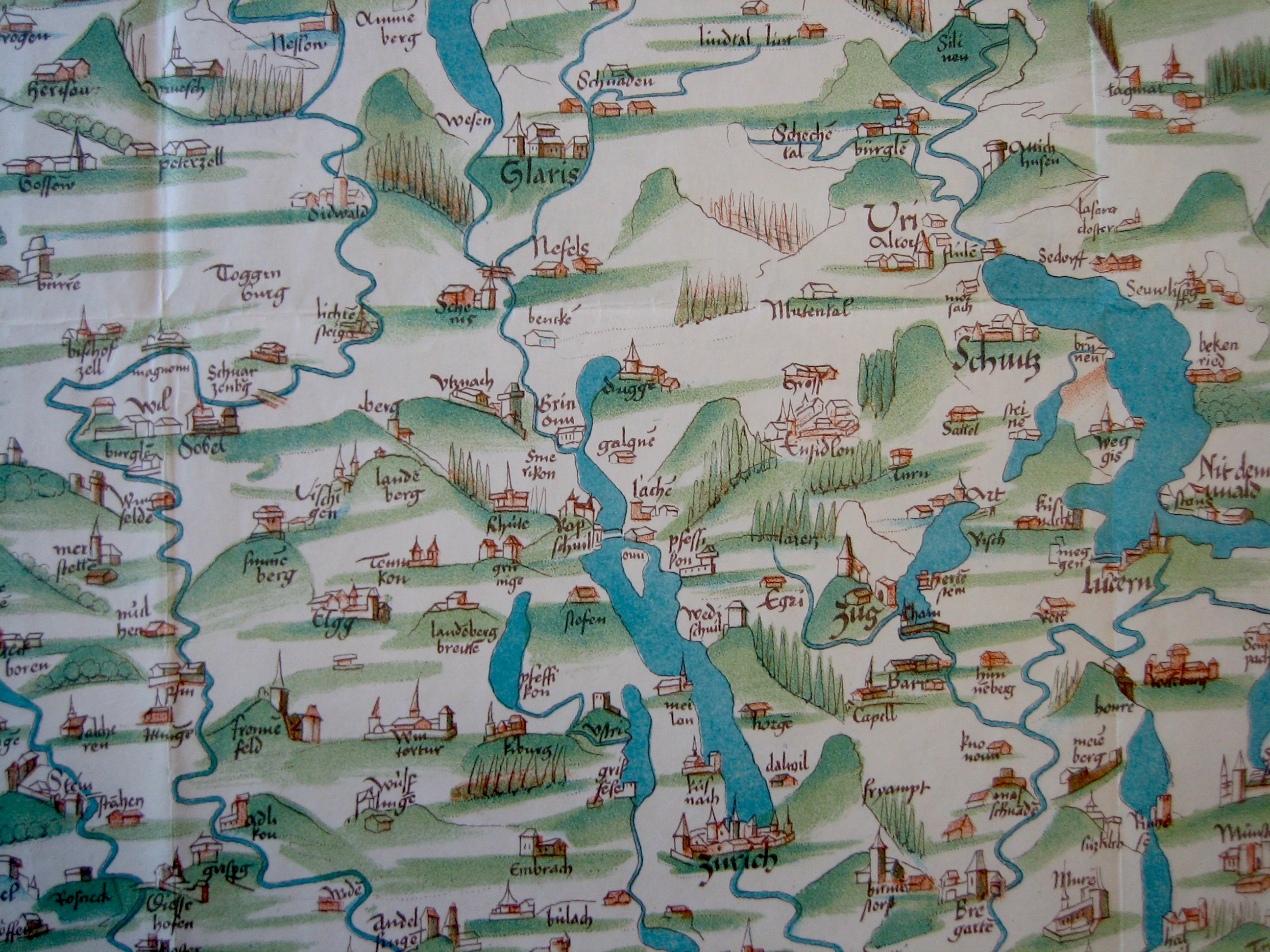
Türst's map (detail), c. 1496.

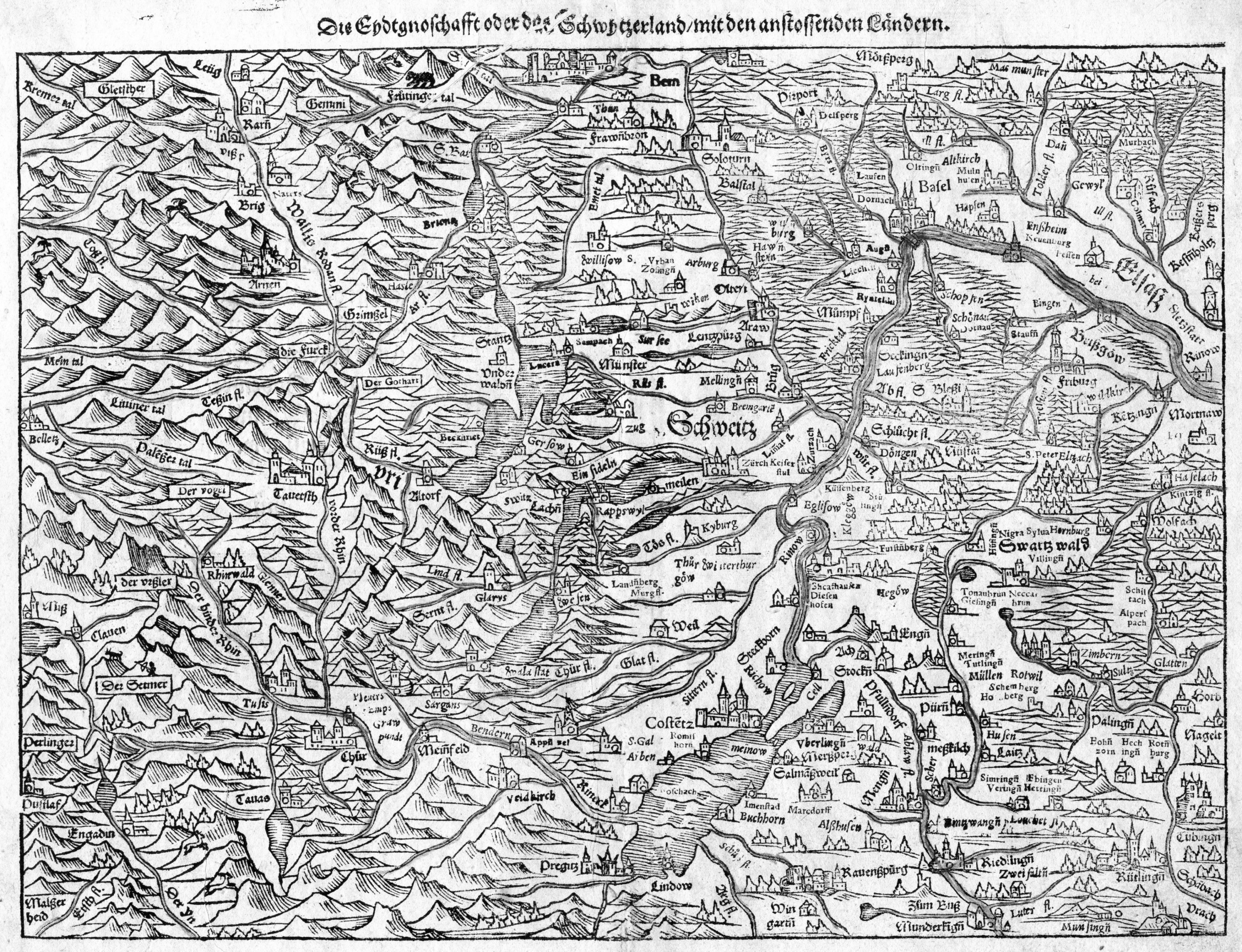
Switzerland in the sixteenth century. Map by Sebastian Münster (ca. 1550).

Helvetia cum finitimis regionibus confoederatis by Gerhard Mercator (1585)

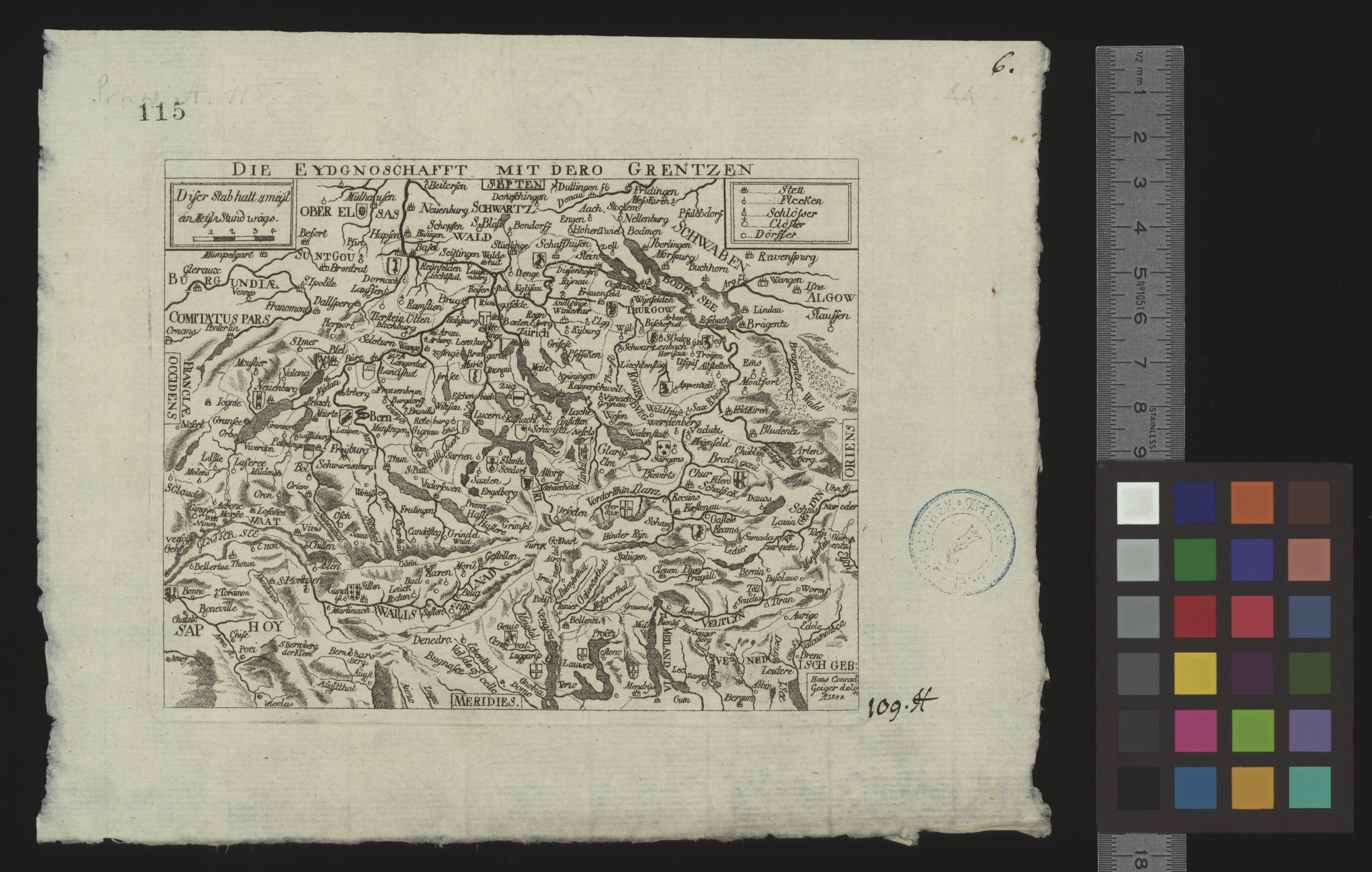
Die Eydgnoschafft mit dero Grentzen by Hans Conrad Gyger (1588)

French-language Charte de la Suisse by Gaspar Baudoin, military engineer in the service of the king of Spain in Milan (1625)

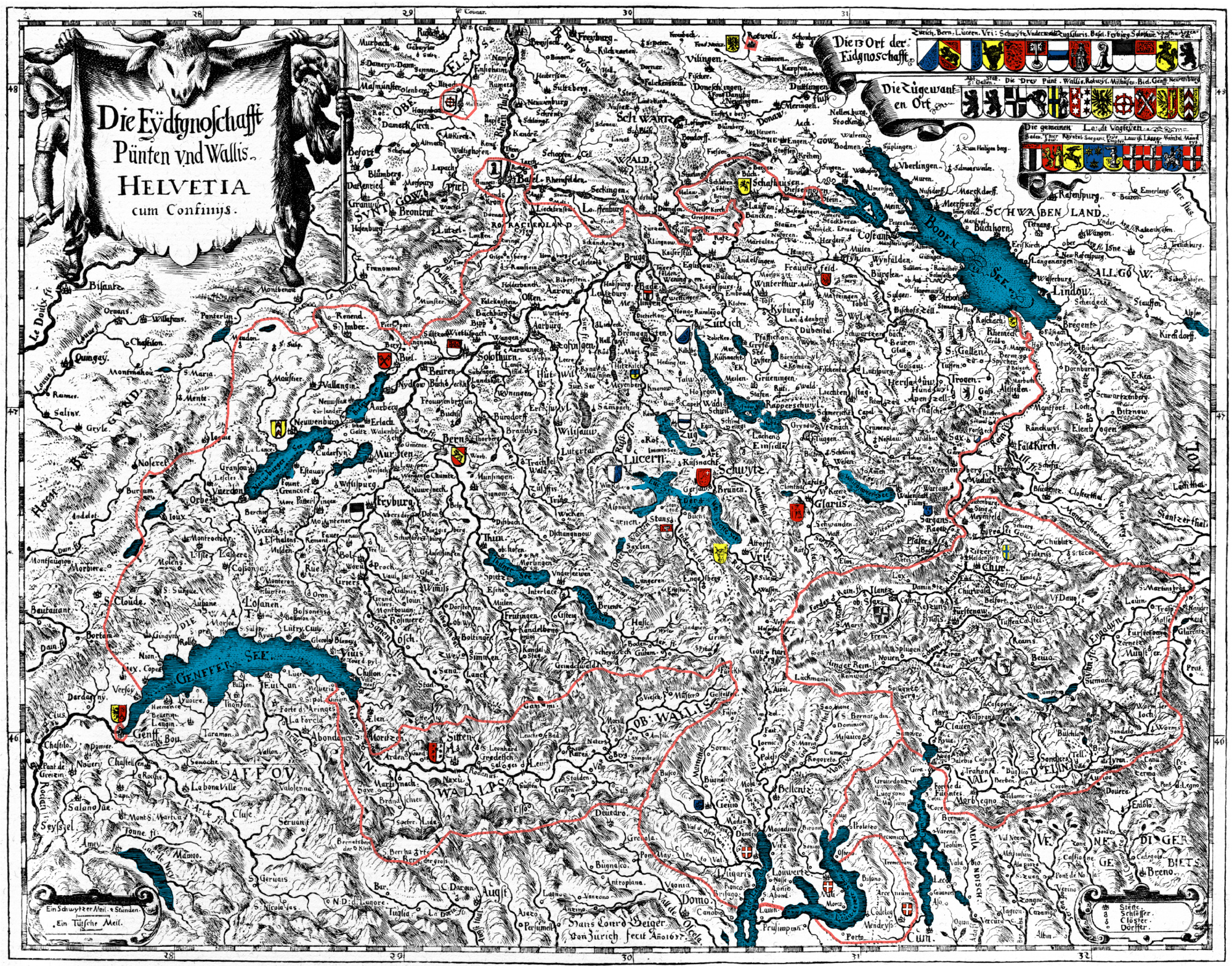
Die Eydtgnoschafft, Pünten und Wallis, Helvetia cum Confiniis (1637)

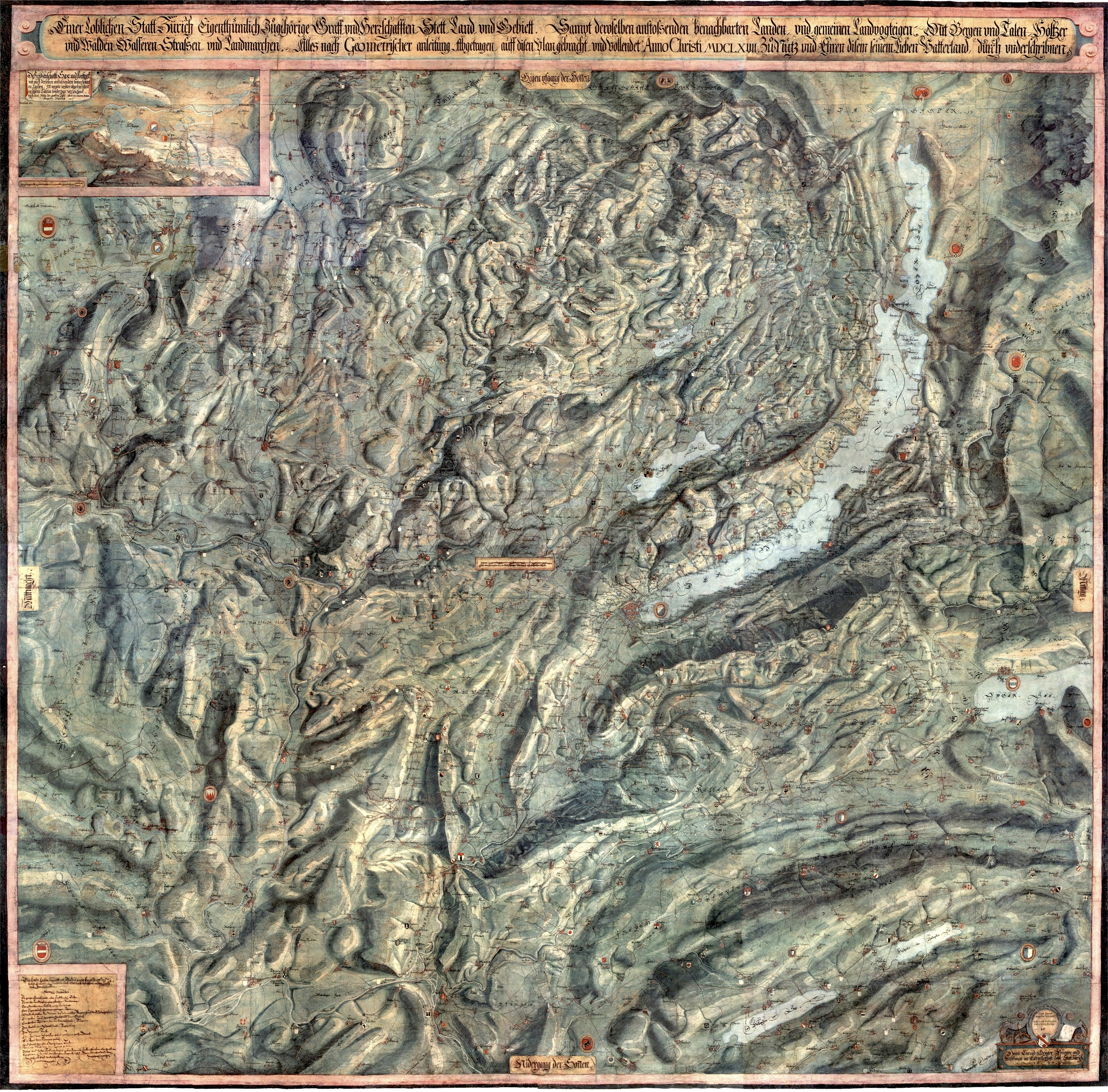
The Gyger map of the canton of Zürich (completed 1667).

A French-language map printed in Paris (1686)

Helvetia Rhaetia, Valesia = Schweitzerland by J. G. Bodenehr (1698)

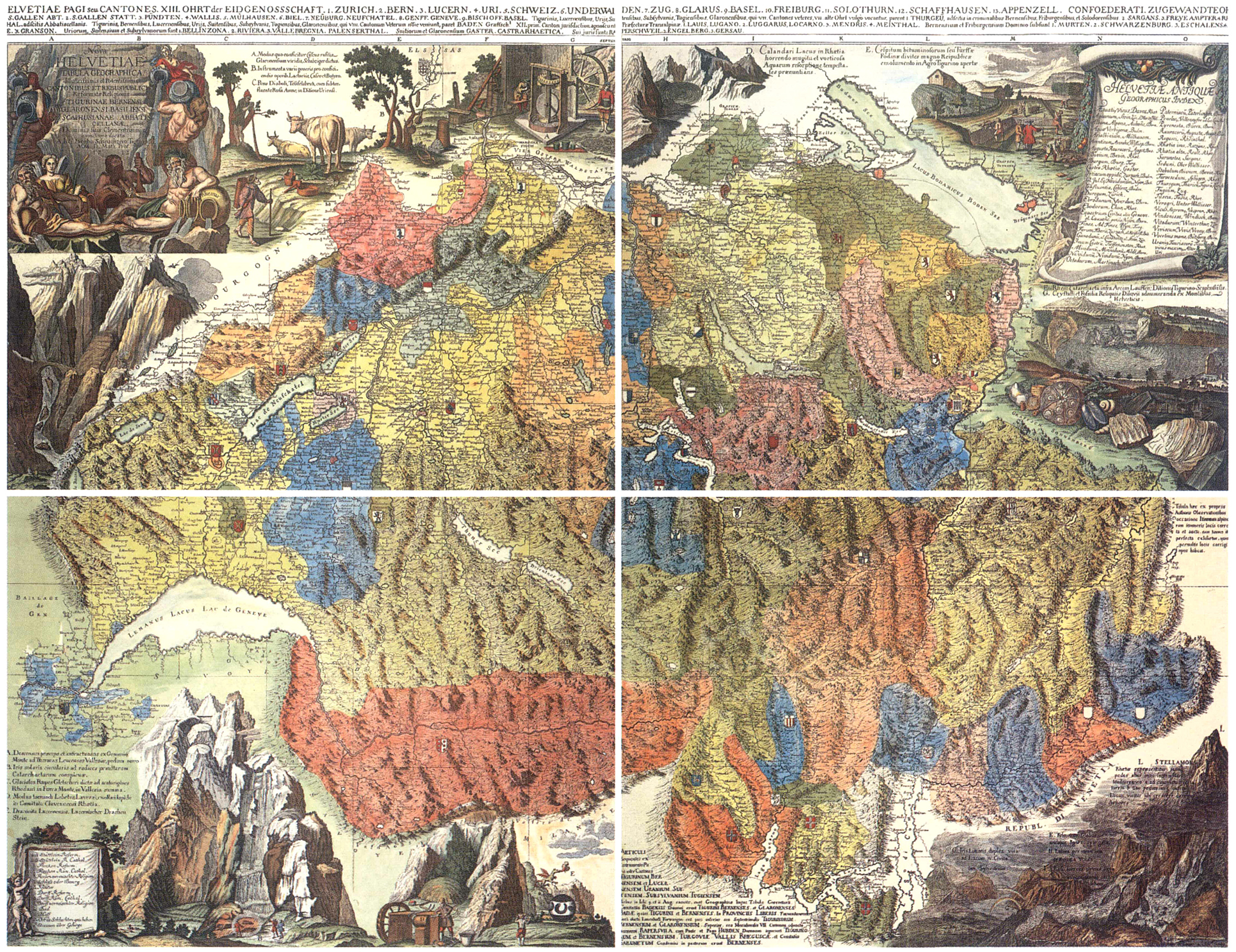
Nova Helvetiae tabula geographica by Johann Jakob Scheuchzer (1712).

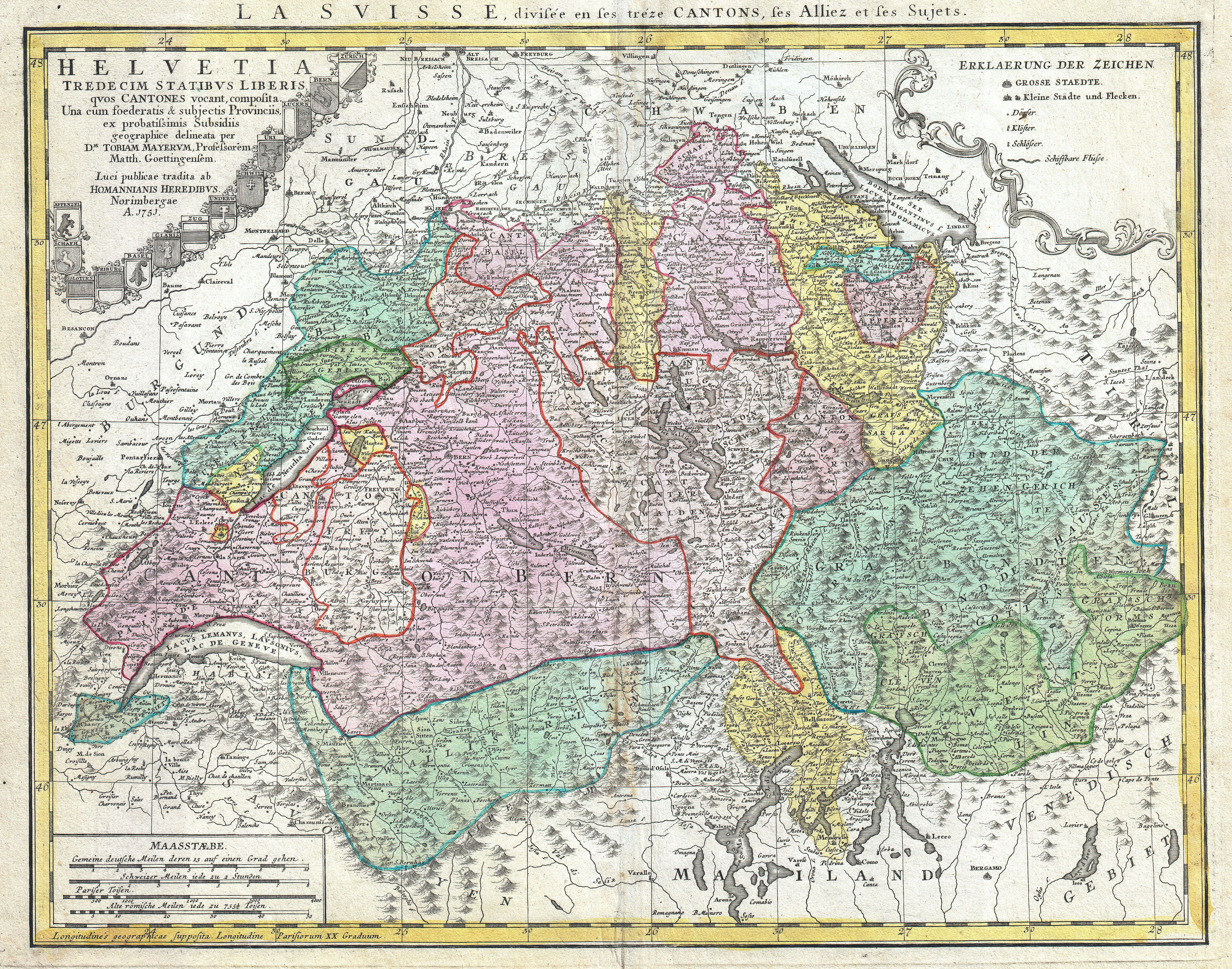
Helvetia Tredecim Statibus Liberis quos Cantones vocant, composita by Tobias Mayer, printed in Nuremberg (1751).

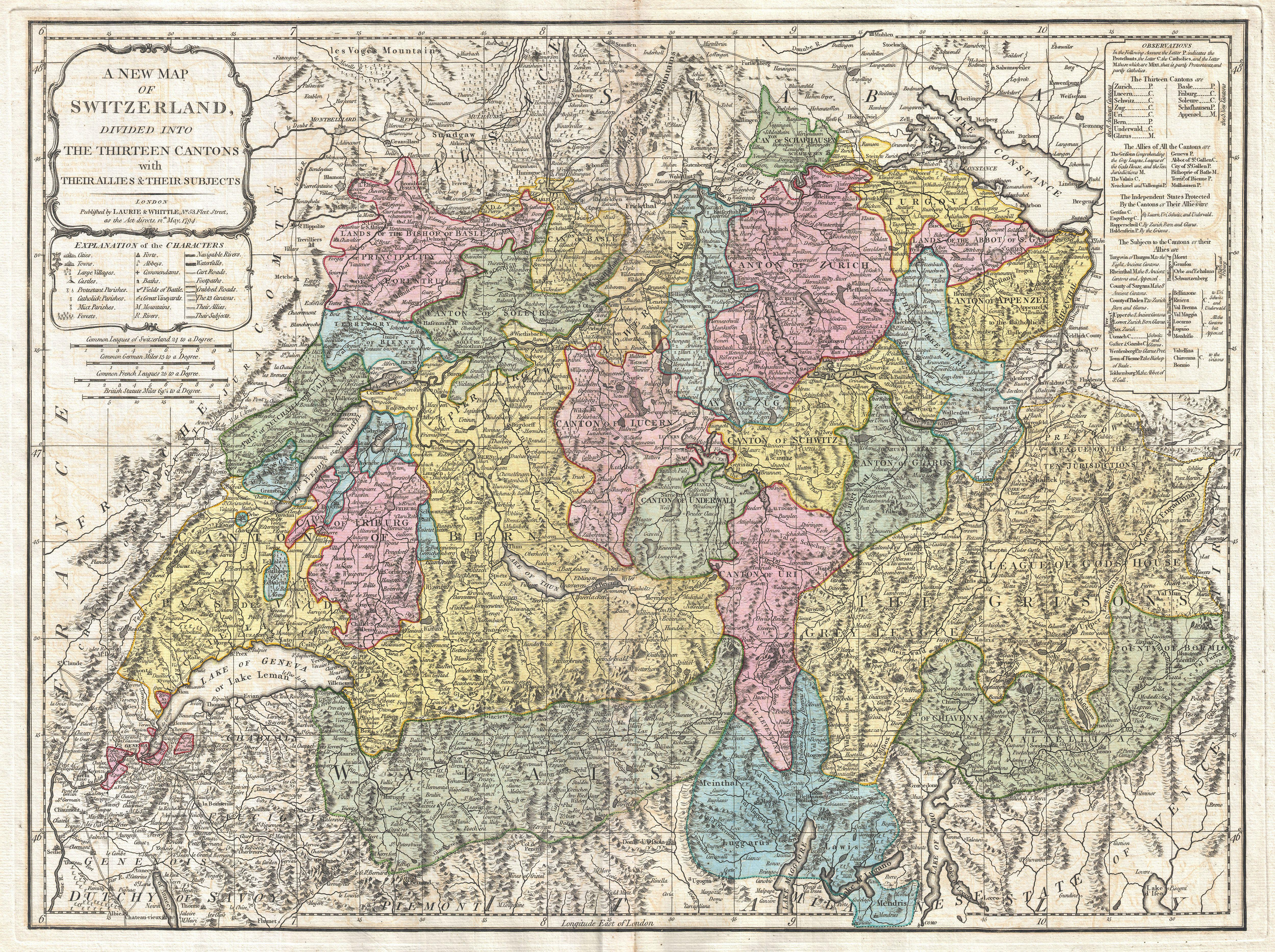
English-language New Map of Switzerland for Kitchin's General Atlas of 1794.

== Dufour Map ==
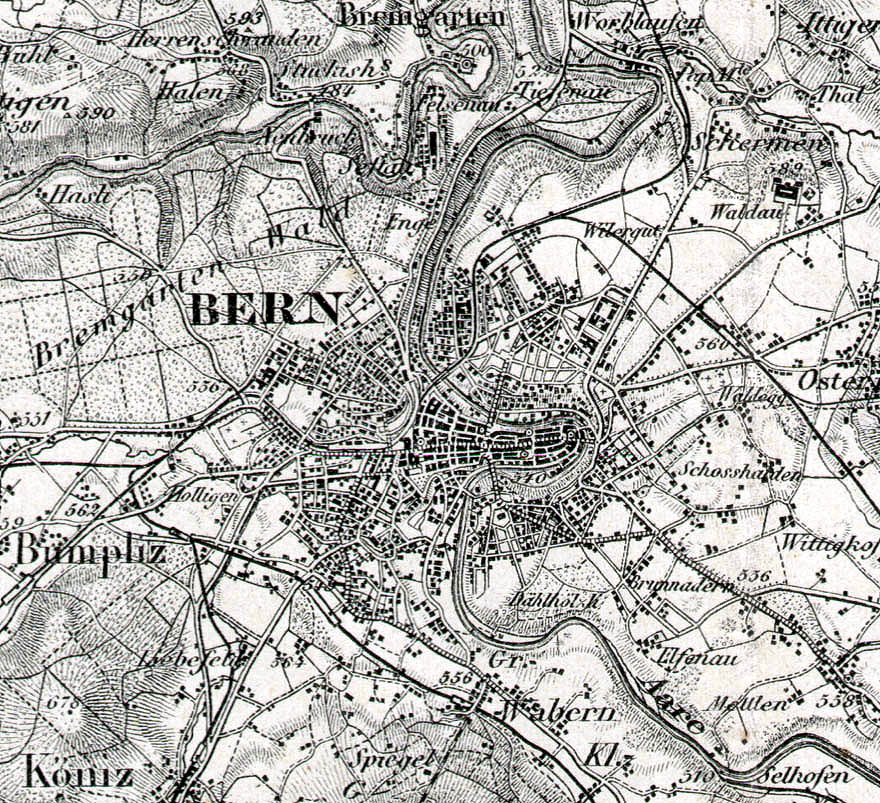
Bern on the 1907 Dufour map.

In 1809, still under the Napoleonic Act of Mediation, the first topographical surveys of Switzerland took place on a confederate, military level. They took place in the north-eastern area and were led by Hans Conrad Finsler. Measurements in the alpine region started in the period of Restauration, in 1825, with triangulations by Antoine-Joseph Buchwalder. This work would be finished in 1837 by Johannes Eschmann. Directly hereafter, at New Year 1838, the Topographical Bureau (Eidgenössisches Topographisches Bureau) is founded in Carouge, Geneve by Guillaume Henri Dufour. This bureau publishes its first map the same year, the Carte topographique du Canton de Genève. Topographic surveys also start in the alpine regions of Switzerland. This has its first results in 1845, a year later than planned, when a map scaled 1:100.000 is published. This is the start of the so-called Dufour Map. The topographic surveys finish in 1862. To honour Dufour, the Swiss government decides to rename the highest peak on the Dufour Map from Höchste Spitze to Dufourspitze: it still carries that name today. In 1863, the SAC published a 1:50.000 map of the region Tödi, based on unpublished survey material. A year later, the last page of the Dufour Map is published, and one year later still, Dufour retires and Hermann Siegfried becomes the Chief op the Topographical Bureau.

== Siegfried Map ==
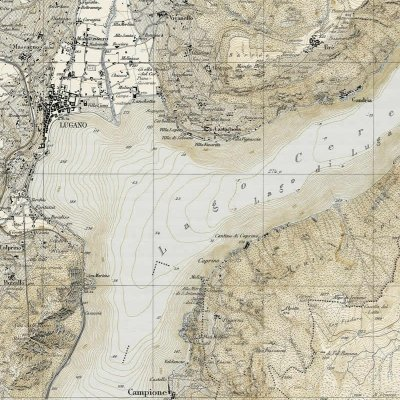
Detail of the 1891 Siegfried Map (TA 541), showing Lugano.

In 1865, Herman Siegfried became the Chief of the Topographical Bureau, and the bureau moved from Geneva to Bern. Over the following few years, a composite map was published of Ticino, soundings had started to measure the depth of the major Swiss lakes, and a first map was published, scaled 1:250.000. In 1868, a Federal Act was passed to enforce the continuation of the initial topographic surveys, as well as the publication of the results. This resulted in new topographical surveys in 1869 and the publication of the first 13 pages of the Siegfried Map (1:25.000 and 1:50.000) in 1870. In 1878, a 1:1.000.000 map was published, and the next year, the height of the Pierre du Niton was measured to be 376.86 metres. In 1880, Herman Siegfried was succeeded by Jules Dumur.

In 1895, the Topographical surveys for the Siegfried Map were finished. By 1901, 581 sheets of the Siegfried Map had been published, with only a few individual more maps to come (there were 604 maps in 1926). On old maps of the modern series, a reference to those maps can still be found: until the 1970s, the Siegfried Map page was the best scale available for some areas of Switzerland, and therefore used by climbers and other alpinists. The printing of the Siegfried Map continued until 1952.

== Relief maps ==
In 1887, the first maps with relief shading are published. In 1889, a photographic studio is appended to the bureau. In the years after 1894, a wall-map for schools is published, in response to a request from the parliament to do so. In 1898, the soundings of the major Swiss lakes are finished. In 1901, the bureau is moved into an independent division within the military, and the name Eidgenössische Landestopographie becomes customary, a name still used by some people until today, and a name which can be found on some older maps. Hermann Kümmerly publishes a relief wall-map for schools in the same year. In 1908, map trials are started to serve as a replacement for the Dufourkarten. Two years later, trials start to replace the Siegfriedkarten. Much of this military work would remain secret for many years. In 1913, 1922 and 1924, trials are done with aerial photogrammetry, first with balloons and later with aircraft, but only as of 1930 this is used for production of maps, and in 1940 terrestrial photogrammetry is abandoned.

== National Maps of Switzerland ==
General Map made with the four 1:200.000 maps

On 21 June 1935, a Federal Act is passed on the production of the new National Map series. This is the start of the modern maps, ranging from 1:25.000 to 1:1.000.000 (see above). Because of the political situation in Europe, work is started on the 1:50.000 maps. For this purpose, a 'M18d' Messerschmitt is bought for aerial photography. This is the first aircraft owned by the Eidgenössischie Landestopographie. In 1938, the first map 1:50.000 is published: 263 Wildstrubel. From 1939 to 1945, all sales are suspended because of World War II. In 1939, the Eidgenössische Landestopographie also gets its first vehicle.

The first 1:25:000 map, 1145 Bielersee, is published in 1952. The last 1:25.000 map, 1292 Maggia, is published in 1979. This marks the finish of the lowest-scale mapping of Switzerland. The first composite in this scale, 2501 St. Gallen, was published in 1956. New composites still appear in 2004.

The 1:50.000 series was completed in 1963 with 285 Domodossola. With the publication of this map, the Siegfriedkarten have been entirely replaced. The first composite on this scale, 5001 Gotthard, was published in 1954. As of 2004, new composites still appear.

The 1:100.000 series started with 41 Col du Pillon (1954), and finished with 47 Monte Rosa in 1965. With this publication, the Dufourkarten have been entirely replaced.

The 1:200.000 series started with No. 3 in 1971 and finished with No. 4 in 1976.

The maps on the scales 1:500.000 and 1:1.000.000 were respectively first published in 1965 and 1994. With the publication of the latter map, the work required by the Federal Act of 1935 was finally finished.

Since 1951, different sorts of leisure maps have been published by the Federal Office of Topography. See above for a list of those.

In 1958, the coordinate system of the maps is changed. Before 1958, the centre of the coordinate system, Bern, had coordinates (0, 0). From this moment, it has coordinates (600, 200). This is done so that any coordinate is either a x-coordinate or a y-coordinate: this prevents confusion about the order of the coordinates.

In 1968, the name officially becomes Eidgenössische Landestopographie instead of Abteilung für Landestopographie, although this had been common practice for decades. The English name remains unchanged (Topographical Survey of Switzerland).

In 1979, the Eidgenössische Landestopographie is renamed to the current name Bundesamt für Landestopographie. See above for the names in other languages. In 2002, the name Swisstopo was adopted (already used as the name of the homepage, www.swisstopo.ch, from 1997).

Since late 2006, Swisstopo offers complete digitized versions of the 1:25,000, 1:50,000 and 1:100,000 maps on DVD.

Example images of the three resolutions of the Swiss national map, showing Blüemlisalp:

1:25,000

1:50,000

1:100,000

== See also ==
- Geography of Switzerland
- Topographic Map of Switzerland (Dufour Map)
- Topographic Atlas of Switzerland (Siegfried Map)
