= Marthe Rajchman =

Polish cartographer

Marthe Rajchman

Marthe Rajchman (1910–1964) was a Polish cartographer. Rajchman was an internationalist, known for the "high standards of clarity, simplicity and accuracy" of her work. She published most of her work between 1938 and 1944. In the late 1930s, she published a series of maps for various authors, the first being Shiela Grant Duff's book Europe and the Czechs. In the same year she worked on her largest project in collaboration with Alexander Radó, when she created 209 maps for The Atlas of To-day and To-morrow. In 1939, she married and lived for a time in South Africa and Mozambique, then moved to the US where she created maps documenting the geopolitical geography of World War II and later lived in Mexico, Argentina, Egypt, Iran and finally Greece following her husband's postings. In each place she would take commissions as the opportunity presented. In 1951 she contracted cancer but continued to work, returning to the US in 1961 for two years and then returning to Athens, Greece, where she died in 1964.

== Life ==
Rajchman was the second daughter of bacteriologist Ludwik Rajchman who was the founder of UNICEF and Marja Bojanczyk, a physician whom he married in 1905. Her older sister was Irena Rajchman and her younger brother was Jan Roman Aleksander Rajchman. Her uncle was Aleksander Rajchman, a prominent Polish mathematician and her aunt was Polish independence activist and historian of education pedagogist Helena Radlińska.

Rajchman completed her secondary education at the International School of Geneva where she was influenced by Paul Dupuy, who believed that cartography and geography should be taught on an internationalist basis. After attending L'Ecole Internationale and graduating in 1928, she studied piano at the Conservatoire de Musique de Genève for two years before deciding to study geography at the Sorbonne matriculating in 1931 and graduating in 1934.

In May 1939, Rajchman married Vincent Czarnowski, who served as Vice-Consul of the Polish Embassy in Johannesburg. In 1940, the couple emigrated to the United States with their baby son, Jan. In the US, Rajchman published a number of maps that detailed the geopolitical geography of World War II. When her husband joined Pharmaceutical company Sterling Drug, the family moved to Monterrey in Mexico in 1944, then to Guadalajara, followed by many years in Argentina, first in Córdoba in Argentina in 1946, followed by eight years in Buenos Aires before they moved to Cairo in 1955, Tehran in 1956 and finally to Athens in 1958. She continued to take commissions during this period.

In 1951 Rajchman was diagnosed with cancer but survived. In 1952, she attended the International Geographical Congress held by the International Geographical Union. In 1961, the family returned to the US for two years, living in Princeton, New Jersey. and then returned to Athens Greece, where Rajchman died on December 31, 1964.

== Bibliography ==
- Duff, Shiela Grant (1938). Europe and the Czechs. Harmondsworth, Middlesex: Penguin Books. OCLC 1122314. Rajchman prepared 9 maps for the book. Rajchman prepared 9 maps for Duff.
- Hudson, G. F.; Rajchman, Marthe; Salter, Arthur (1942). An explanatory atlas of the Far East. London: Faber and Faber Limited. OCLC 1868022. Rajchman created 33 maps for this atlas.
- Mowrer, Edgar Ansel (1938). Mowrer in China. Harmondsworth: Penguin Books. OCLC 4599706. Rajchman created 6 maps for Mowrer.
- Mowrer, Edgar Ansel; Rajchman, Marthe (1942). Global war : an atlas of world strategy. New York: W. Morrow. OCLC 459675549. Rajchman created 10 maps for her atlas.
- Pringle, J. M. D.; Rajchman, Marthe (1939). China struggles for unity. London: Penguin Books Limited. OCLC 1112520600. Rajchman created 69 maps for this atlas along with 8 charts.
- Rajchman, Marthe (1941). A new atlas of China : land, air and sea routes. New York: John Day Company (for Asia Magazine). OCLC 864558. Rajchman created 10 maps for her atlas.
- Rajchman, Marthe (September 1942). "Map of Colonial Possessions". Democracy and World Affairs. III (4). New York: Free World Inc: 318–324.
- Rajchman, Marthe (1944). Europe, an atlas of human geography. New York: William Morrow and Company. OCLC 399636. Rajchman created 61 maps for this atlas.
- Radó, Alexander; Rajchman, Marthe (1938). The Atlas of To-day and To-morrow. London: Victor Gollancz. OCLC 17856203. Rajchman created 209 maps for Alexander Radó "The atlas of to-day and to-morrow" which included Choropleth maps.
