= National Maps of Switzerland =

Series of official Swiss maps

General Map of Switzerland (1:200,000)

The National Maps of Switzerland, also referred to as the Swisstopo maps, are a set of official map series designed, edited and distributed by Swisstopo, the Swiss Federal Office of Topography. Each map series is based on an oblique, conformal, cylindrical projection (Mercator projection), with a Swiss Coordinate system (CH1903 +). All maps are updated in a complete cycle of about six years.

In 1938, the Federal Office of Topography started issuing new map sheets, which were intended to succeed the old Dufour and Siegfried Maps. They first appeared in 1:50,000 scale, and from 1952 also in 1:25,000 scale. In addition, further generalisations were made in smaller scales. In each scale, the whole of Switzerland was covered. In 1979, with the issuance of the last 1:25,000 scale sheet, the work was completed.

The map sheets have been produced in several different versions: topographic maps, tourist maps, special maps (for aerospace, geology, etc.). They are now also available on electronic media. The topographic maps have been published in the following scale series:

Name	Scale	Publication years	Cover colour	No. of sheets
National map	1:25,000	1952–1979	brown	247
National map	1:50,000	1938–1963	dark green	78
National map	1:100,000	1954–1965	light red	23
National map	1:200,000		orange	4
General map	1:300,000		blue	1
National map	1:500,000		dark red	1
National map	1:1,000,000		light green	1

The normal map sheets are arranged in a grid pattern. In addition, there are composition maps (i.e. extending over sheet borders) covering urban agglomerations, or tourist areas. Many of 1:50,000 scale map sheets are also available as hiking maps (with highlighted trails) or as ski tour maps.

The Federal Office of Topography also publishes the following digital products:

- National Map 1:25,000 on DVD (Swiss Map 25);
- National Map 1:50,000 on DVD (Swiss Map 50);
- National Map 1:100,000 on CD-ROM (Swiss Map 100); and
- For professional applications:
  - Digital landscape models as pixel maps for all scales;
  - Digital landscape models as vector data based on the 1:25,000 (VECTOR25) and 1:200,000 (VECTOR200) topographic map sheets; and
  - Digital elevation models with a grid size of 25 metres (82 ft) (DTM25) and 2 metres (6 ft 7 in) (DOM / DTM – AV).

For all of these maps, the Pierres du Niton rocks, in the port of Geneva, are the reference point for height measurements.

In 2005, a proposal for the spelling of local names (field names) on the national map in a manner closer to the way in which they are pronounced was made available for the formal Swiss consultation process. Many national map users are opposed to this proposal.

1:25'000 examples by terrain type

Cities (1091 Zürich)

Productive land (1074 Bischofszell)

Forests (1312 Locarno)

Water (1164 Neuchâtel)

Ice and rocks (1249 Finsteraarhorn)
