= Europe and the Czechs =

1938 book by Shiela Grant Duff

- Author: Shiela Grant Duff
- Language: English
- Genre: Non-fiction
- Publication date: 1938
- Publication place: United Kingdom

Europe and the Czechs was an influential and widely read best-selling Penguin Special written by journalist Shiela Grant Duff in 1938 during the appeasement of World War II . Her prominence as a journalist was established with this publication. It was published on the day British prime minister Neville Chamberlain returned from Munich in which he pressured Czechoslovakia to cede territory to Nazi Germany, and it was distributed to every member of parliament. In her book she defended the Czech nation and criticized British policy, claiming that war could be an option if it were necessary to confront Hitler's aggression in Czechoslovakia. She argued against the policy of "peace at almost any price". The books maps were created by Marthe Rajchman.

== See also ==
- Guilty Men, a more polemic piece published two years later.
