= World Map 1:2,500,000 =

Division of the world into the sheets of the map series

The World Map 1:2,500,000 (Russian: Карта Мира 1:2,500,000) is an internationally standardized and edited map series. The Russian term Карта Мира or in transcription Karta Mira is now commonly used to describe this series, even outside the Soviet Union or Russia. The Karta Mira consists of a total of 224 (#1–17 & 28–234) main sheets and 38 overlap sheets (although at least 10 were dropped). They depict the entire earth (land and water surfaces) according to a uniform scale, coloring and drawing system. The Karta Mira 1956–1975 was produced by cartographers from Bulgaria, Czechoslovakia, the German Democratic Republic (GDR), Hungary, Poland, Romania and the Soviet Union.

The production of a 1:2,500,000 scale map of the world had been discussed since the late 1940s, partly because many cartographers were dissatisfied with the work on the International Map of the World (or Millionth Map, after its scale of 1:1,000,000). Due to the destruction of the Central Bureau of the Map of the World in London during World War II, the Millionth Map had suffered a serious setback, and it was uncertain whether that series could ever be completed.

The initiative for the production of the Karta Mira was taken by cartographers from Hungary (Alexander Radó, Peter Halasz, E. Foldi, Istvan Joo), the Soviet Union (Grigory A. Ginzburg (Григорий А. Гинзбург), Ilya Andreyevich Kutuzov (Илья Андреевич Кутузов)) and the GDR (Erfried Haack, Horst Nischan, Manfred Pateisat).

Production of the 262 sheets was divided between the geodetic services of the participating countries. Thus, the sheets to be produced in the GDR were printed by VEB Hermann Haack Geographisch-Kartographische Anstalt Gotha and VEB Kombinat Geodäsie und Kartographie in Leipzig and Potsdam. The sheets to be produced in the Soviet Union were created by the Department of Geodesy and Cartography (Главное управление геодезии и картографии) in Moscow. Proofs of several of the sheets involved in the series were presented by East German cartographers at an international conference in Erfurt in December 1963.

The first four sheets were published in 1964, and the final sheets of the first edition in 1976. Sheets were published in several versions: a full version, a version without contours (for social science thematic mapping) and a version without placenames and infrastructure (for scientific thematic mapping). The title of each sheet was given in Cyrillic and Latin alphabets, but all placenames on the map itself were given only in the Latin alphabet.

Publication of a second edition began in 1989, but appears to have been abandoned with the collapse of the Communist regimes in the Eastern Bloc shortly thereafter.

== See also ==
- Cartography
