= Topographic Atlas of Switzerland =

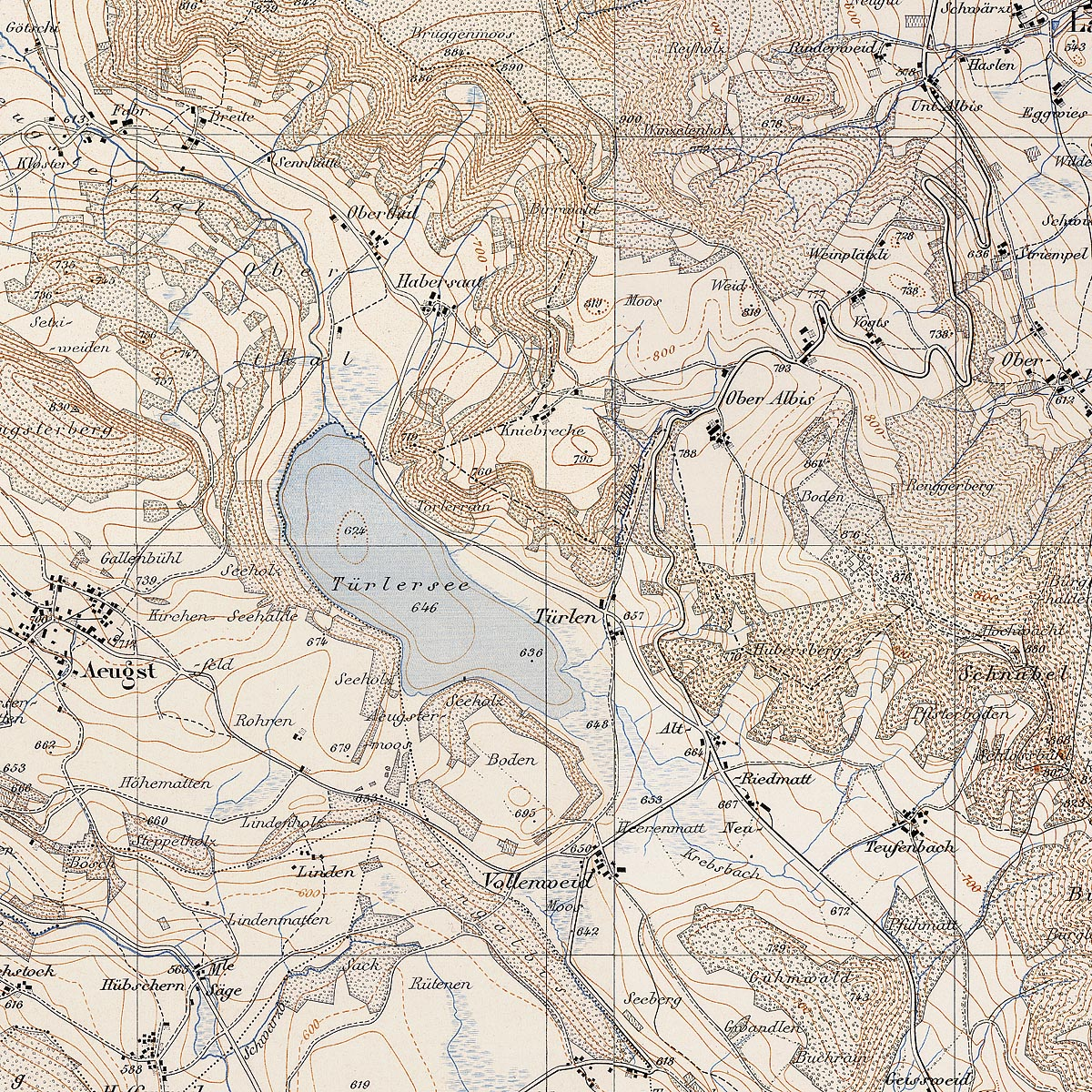
Siegfried Map of the Türlersee region in the Canton of Zürich

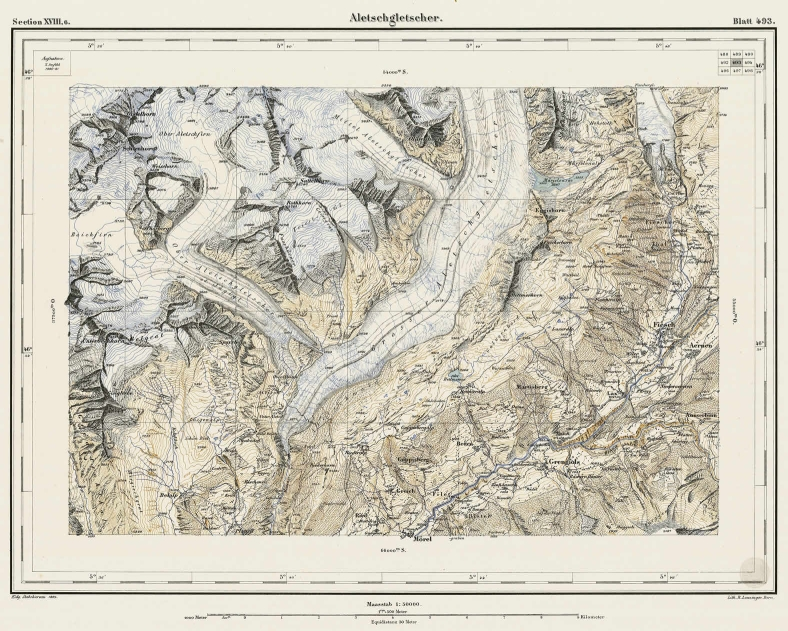
Siegfried Map of the Aletsch Glacier region (1882; Lithography by Rudolf Leuzinger). It is interesting to compare the size of the Märjelensee and the extent of the glaciers with current data.

The Topographic Atlas of Switzerland (German: Topographischer Atlas der Schweiz), also known as the Siegfried Atlas or Siegfried Map (German: Siegfriedkarte; French: Carte Siegfried), is an official map series of Switzerland. Its publication was begun by the Federal Topographic Bureau under Hermann Siegfried, and continued from 1870 to 1926. During this period the individual maps were drawn by different lithographers, including Walter Hauenstein, Georg Christian von Hoven and Rudolf Leuzinger. Since it is, in today's parlance, not strictly an atlas but a map series, map historians now describe it only by the expression Siegfried Map.

The Siegfried Map was based on the original records that had already been created for the earlier Dufour Map. However, the Siegfried Map offered greater precision than the Dufour Map, by using a scale of 1:25,000 for the Swiss Plateau, the French Prealps, the Jura Mountains and southern Ticino, and a scale of 1:50,000 for other mountain regions and the Swiss Alps.

The area covered by the former scale was initially divided into 462 pages, and the other area into 142 pages, with the two areas overlapping in places. A format of 35 centimetres (14 in) x 24 centimetres (9.4 in) for each page was common to both scales.

Another significant departure from the Dufour Map was the use of contour lines to represent relief, with a contour interval of 10 metres (33 ft) on the 1:25 000 sheets and 30 metres (98 ft) on the 1:50 000 sheets. In addition, three colours were used directly in printing, whereas the Dufour Map was initially monochrome. On the Siegfried Map, brown was used for contour lines on vegetated terrain, blue for water and contour lines on glaciers, and black for all other features.

The Siegfried Map projection was a cone equivalent, as for the Dufour Map.

The print mode used for the 1:25,000 pages was initially intaglio, and from 1905 a printing plate. The 1:50,000 pages were printed via a lithography process, and from 1910 by intaglio.

Until 1949, there were occasional revised editions of Siegfried Map pages. From 1952, the Siegfried and Dufour Maps were replaced by the new National Map of Switzerland.
