= Map series =

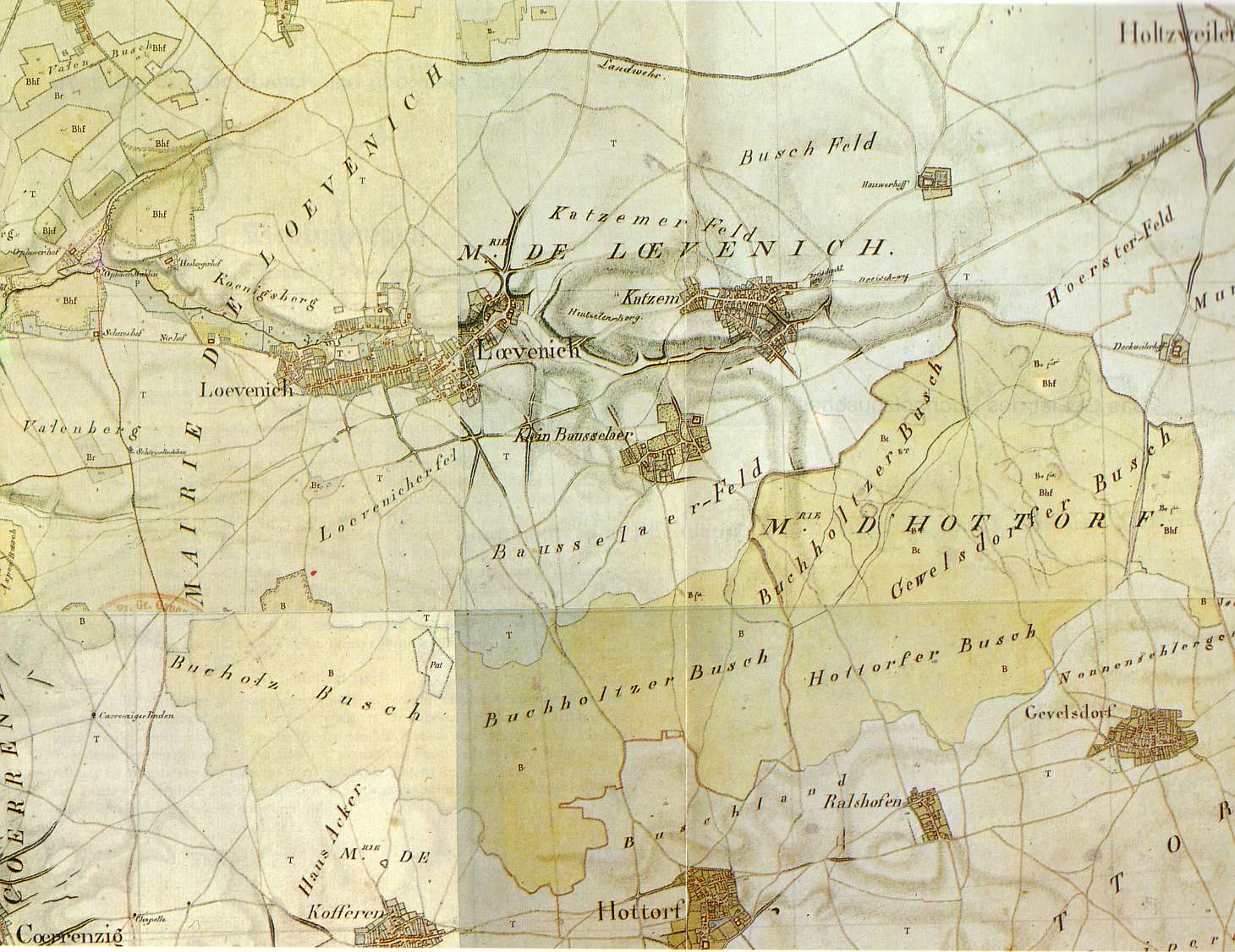
Mairie de Loevenich (Germany), from the Topographic Survey of the Rhineland by Tranchot/Müffling, sheet 57 (published 1806/07).

A map series is a group of topographic or thematic charts or maps usually having the same scale and cartographic specifications, and with each sheet appropriately identified by its publisher as belonging to the same series.

Map series occur when an area is to be covered by a map that, due to its scale, must be spread over several sheets. Nevertheless, the individual sheets of a map series can also be used quite independently, as they generally have full map surround details and legends. If a publisher produces several map series at different scales, for instance 1:25,000, 1:50,000 and 1:100,000, then these series are called scale series.

According to 2007/2/EC European directive, national mapping agencies of European Union countries must have publicly available services for searching, viewing and downloading their official map series. Maps produced by some of them are available under a free license that allows re-use, such as a Creative Commons license.

== The concept of a map series ==
In everyday use, individual maps and atlases are sometimes described as being part of a "map series". However, that is not a correct use of the technical language of cartography, in which the term map series refers exclusively to the phenomenon described here, namely a map published over several sheets. The scope of a map series can range from as few as two sheets to at least tens of thousands of sheets.

Obsolete maps, especially of the 19th century, are often named Topographic Atlases, because their small-sized sheets were also bound into atlases. An example of such a map series is the Topographic Atlas of the Kingdom of Hanover and the Duchy of Brunswick.

A map series is not to be confused with a map collection, which is a map storage site and its contents, usually forming part of a library, archive, museum, or held at the premises of a map publisher or public authority.

== Publication forms ==
Extract of the 1:25,000 Swiss National Map showing Lake Lucerne on nine different sheets

It is technically very difficult, and it would be highly impractical, to print, e.g., the National Map of Switzerland on a single sheet at a scale of 1:25,000 (that particular map would be about 9 metres (30 ft) high and 14 metres (46 ft) wide). For that reason, map series are issued and preserved in loose-leaf form. In extreme cases, a map series can include thousands of sheets. Probably the greatest map series ever created is the 1:25,000 topographic map of the Soviet Union, with about 300,000 sheets, completed in 1987.

Occasionally, smaller map series will be compiled by the buyer into a bound volume, without thereby incorporating into the bound work the otherwise typical features of an atlas.

The sheets of a map series can also be glued by the buyer to their neighbouring sheets, especially as a wall decoration. So, for example, the National Map of Switzerland (1:100,000), which consists of 22 sheets, can be seen as a wall decoration in the Federal Palace of Switzerland and in the Swiss National Library.

== Features ==
Map series are divided into particular systems of single sheets named and numbered according to common principles. Thus, the characteristics of a particular sheet in a map series apply equally to all the other sheets of the map series. So, for example, all sheets normally have the same cartographic projections, geodetic datums, scale, and a uniform content and cartographic design.

=== Sheet network designs ===
Theoretically, almost any sheet network design can be used. In practice, variants of the mercator projection are the most widely used today, frequently in conjunction with the UTM coordinate system.

=== Organization ===
All sheets of a map series are created in the same way. Thus, they bear all of the common map series titles, have the same author and copyright notices, use the same map legend and, with the exception of any possible edge sheets, are usually printed on paper of a uniform size. An individual sheet's title and number identifies and locates that sheet's place in the map series.

=== Nature of the sheet divisions ===
The sheets are divided from each other either square to the map grid, or along the meridians and parallels. In the first case, the sheets will all be the same size. In the second case, the sheet size will decrease towards the north (for a northern hemisphere map) or the south (for a southern hemisphere map).

Regardless of the selected type of division, there is a convention that four sheets of a particular scale map are used to depict the same area as one sheet of the next smaller scale map series produced by the same publisher.

== Numbering and naming systems ==
To determine whether a specific map sheet forms part of a map series, it is often sufficient simply to search for a map sheet number. These numbers are usually printed prominently on the map sheet, and facilitates the identification of connecting sheets, either directly, or indirectly with the aid of a sheet index.

The following numbering systems are the main ones used:

40	5	8
	32	15

Consecutively in order of appearance: The sheets are numbered consecutively as each is published. Thus, it is not possible to determine the sheets neighbouring a particular sheet without a current sheet index. Nor is it always possible to indicate on a sheet's map surround the numbers of adjacent sheets, as the date of publication of forthcoming sheets (and therefore their place in the numbering system) may not yet be known. This system is therefore suitable only for small maps, or those in an irregular sheet division (as in tourist maps published by the private sector), and is seldom now used for modern official map series. Example: Geological Atlas of Switzerland (1:25,000).

36	37	38
42	43	44

Continuous row by row, or column by column: The numbering starts at top left with the northwesternmost sheet, then rises on the same row towards the right (east) to jump from there to the left (westernmost) sheet of the next lower (southern) row, etc. In some countries, this system is applied not row by row, but column by column. The disadvantage of both options is that in each case two of the four sheets adjacent to each sheet are not directly identifiable from the numbers. To address this problem, the neighbouring sheet numbers are usually printed on the map surround of each sheet. Example: Belgique (1:50,000).

1211	1212	1213
1231	1232	1233

According to zones and columns: These numbers run row by row from the left (west) to the right (east). In contrast with the previous numbering system, the number of the left hand sheet in the next lower (southern) row will jump to a specific higher value (e.g. 20, 100). All sheets in any particular column will therefore bear one or more identical digit(s). Such numbering systems often use four-digit numbers, and make note of the jump in value in a simple way to facilitate identification of neighboring sheets. Example: National Map of Switzerland (1:25,000).

3648	3748	3848
3647	3747	3847

By longitude and latitude: The sheets are arranged by integer numbers, denoting geographical longitude and latitude (the reverse order is not common). The geographical location of the map sheets in this system can be directly localized. Unlike the previous system, each adjacent lower (southern) row bears lower numbers, and the final digit for each of the sheets in a particular row is always the same. At least in Central Europe, the numbers used in this system are made up of four digits. Example: General map of Central Europe (1:300,000).

M-35-V	M-35-VI	M-36-I
M-35-XI	M-35-XII	M-36-VII

According to subdivisions of the International Map of the World: The sheet numbers of the International Map of the World 1:1,000,000 are augmented in the next smaller scale by a suffix (e.g. capital letters). Sheet numbers of each further smaller scale will bear a different system of suffixes (e.g., Roman numerals, small letters, etc.). These numbers can become very complex, but at the same time allow "the experts" to gain at least a rough location of the map sheet on the globe. Example: Soviet General Staff map (1:200,000).

The name of a sheet, regardless of the chosen sheet dividing and numbering system, depends almost entirely upon the largest town depicted on the sheet. Since the publication in the 18th century of the important French Carte de Cassini 1:86,400, nearly all sheets of map series globally have been not only numbered, but also given an individual sheet name. The current practice is that only sheets depicting very remote areas with a shortage of toponyms (e.g. in northern Canada ) are published without their own sheet names.

== Current map series ==
Most nations of any significant size now have several topographic map series of coordinated scales (scale series). Examples of such series are the German Topographic maps of 1:25.000 scale (TK25) to 1:1,000,000 scale (TK1000). In Germany, the federal States have responsibility for the production and updating of the map series up to and including 1:100,000 scale, and for larger scales the responsibility rests with the Federal Office of Land Surveying. The small scale map series are edited by the Federal Agency for Cartography and Geodesy.

In most European countries, the largest scale topographic map series is a 1:25.000 scale series. Notable exceptions are Austria (1:50,000) and Finland (1:20,000).

Many non-European states limit the largest scale of their map series, usually to 1:50,000 scale, frequently due to the large size of the country covered (and hence for financial reasons). A noted exception is the quadrangle series of the United States in 1:24,000 scale.

A high-profile has been gained worldwide by map series published as a collaborative effort by several countries, especially the International Map of the World (1:1,000,000) (IMW) and the World Map / Karta Mira (1:2.500,000). The IMW was developed from 1913. Although many sheets of the IMW were published, the series as a whole was never finished. The Karta Mira was published from 1963. Although it is complete, it has not been revised since the 1980s. Both map series also served as a basis for thematic mapping.

== Historical map series ==
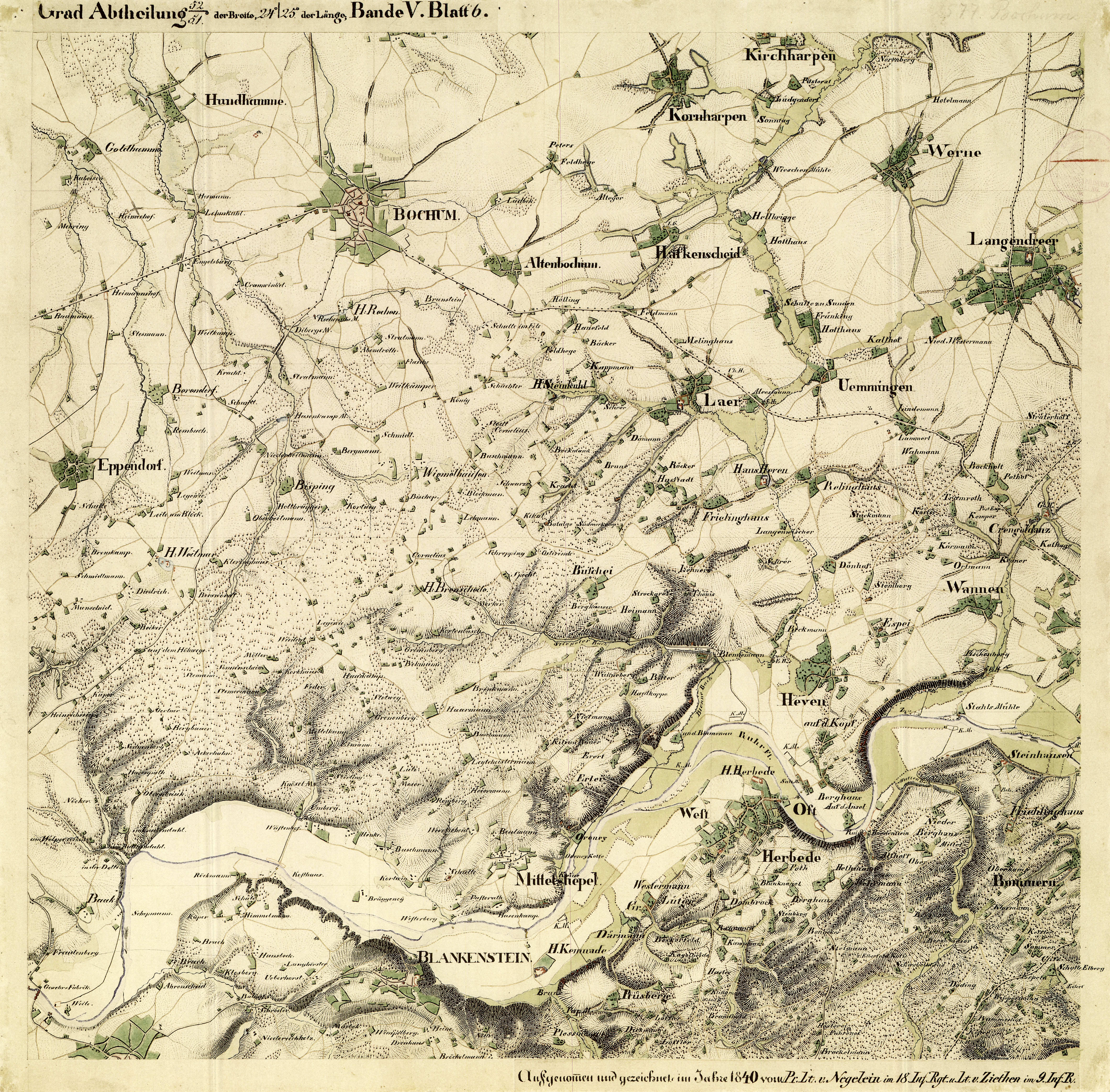
Bochum (Germany), in the Prussian original survey, 1840.

The first map series, still unpublished to this day, are probably the First Saxon land survey by Matthias Oeder and Balthasar Zimmermann (surveyed between 1586 and 1633) and the Swedish land survey of Western Pomerania (surveyed 1692-1709). The first published, and thus trendsetting, map series is likely to be the Carte de Cassini, published from 1756 and finished only at the beginning of the 19th century.

Especially in the German-speaking countries, the 19th century was the golden era of the map series then described as Topographic Atlases. Most of the German states of the 19th century introduced their own map series, which were only later adapted, under Prussian guidance, to coordinate with each other. A trendsetter was the Prussian new survey (1:25.000), published between 1877 and 1915. Today, many of the present States of Germany sell reproductions of their historic map series, and some of these map series are also available as digital editions on CD-ROM or online.

Historical map series can still be used by historians, landscape architects, etc., for comparative studies. In contrast with single sheet maps, map series have the advantage of representing a larger area in a uniform manner and have documented card network designs and recording methods.
