= Maria Josefovna Poliakova =

Soviet agent who helped create the Rote Drei

- Полякова Мария Иосифовна
- Maria Poliakova as a young woman.
- Born: 27 March 1908; Saint Petersburg
- Died: 7 May 1995 (aged 87); Moscow, Soviet Union
- Spouse: Joseph Ditska (?-1941; his death)
- Children: 1
- Military career
- Allegiance: Communist Party of the Soviet Union
- Rank: Colonel GRU Lieutenant Colonel

- Awards

Maria Josefovna Poliakova (27 March 1908 – 7 May 1995) was a Jewish Soviet colonel and 4th Department spy who played the principal role in organising the Soviet espionage network in Switzerland, that was later known as the Rote Drei.

== Life ==
Poliakova's father was Joseph Aronovich Poliakov (or Polyakov; 1887–1937), a native of Romny. He was a Menshevik, who during the Soviet era served in the Commissariat for Foreign Trade. His work involved extensive travel to various European countries including England, Germany and France. On 20 September 1937, he was shot dead, as part of Stalin's purges.

Her mother, Basia Solomonovna Poliakova, was a seamstress. In 1917 she was a candidate for the Kiev City Duma and for the council of the Jewish community of the city for the General Jewish Labour Bund. During the Soviet era, she was a secretary of the Foreign Trade Commissariat. Her brother was writer Ariy Polyakov.

Poliakova was married to a professional Czech revolutionary Joseph Ditska. They had a daughter, Svetlana. Joseph Ditska died in August 1941, while on a special mission in Poland, the rear of the German forces.

== Career ==
Between 1921 and 1925, Poliakova studied abroad - in Germany and Great Britain, where her parents worked in trade missions for the USSR. As the family travelled with her father, Poliakova learned several languages including French, German and English. In 1925, she moved to Moscow.

Between 1925 and 1932 she participated in the Young Communist International and the Comintern as a dedicated communist. In 1931, the central committee of the Komsomol recommended Poliakova for training to Soviet Military Intelligence. Poliakova attended a course at the Higher Intelligence School.

From 1935, Poliakova served in the Red Army. From January 1935 to January 1936, she studied at the School of Intelligence Administration of the Frunze Military Academy, after which, on 19 June 1936, Poliakova was promoted to Senior lieutenant (Russian: старший лейтенант, starshy leytenant)

During the 1930s, Poliakova was posted on several assignments abroad in France and Switzerland. Her aliases were Mildred, Gisela, and Vera.

In 1936–37, Poliakova was an illegal resident in the Soviet military intelligence network in Switzerland, that was later known as the Rote Drei. Her contacts in Switzerland were Rachel Dübendorfer, Selma Gessner–Bührer, and, in France, Henry Robinson. In 1937, Poliakova was recalled to the Soviet Union. She survived the purges. However, her brother and father were shot. As a result of the murders of her father and brother, Poliakova became embittered of Stalin's regime. In 1937-41 she worked in the central apparatus of the Intelligence Directorate of the Red Army headquarters, Moscow. She trained new employees, worked in military-technical and military intelligence units.

In 1944, Poliakova was promoted from Captain to Major. She remained active as an espionage agent in the GRU until 1953.
