= Nachrichtendienst =

Nachrichtendienst may refer to:

- Allgemeiner Deutscher Nachrichtendienst, German Democratic Republic state news agency
- Militärischer Nachrichtendienst, Swiss military intelligence agency
- Strategischer Nachrichtendienst, Swiss foreign intelligence agency
- Bundesnachrichtendienst, German foreign intelligence service
- Nachrichtendienst, the Nazi German secret intelligence agency in the novels of Robert Ludlum
