= Maximator =

Maximator may refer to:

== Beer ==
- Amsterdam Maximator
- Augustiner Maximator

== Organisations ==
- Maximator (intelligence alliance), an intelligence alliance between Denmark, France, Germany, the Netherlands, and Sweden.

== People ==
- Max Schuar, nicknamed Maximator, a member of the band Eisbrecher
