= Hans Wegmueller =

Hans Wegmueller was born in Switzerland and was head of the Swiss intelligence agencies from 2001–2008. He joined the service in 1978. In 2018 he became a founding director of a private intelligence firm.

== Education ==
- Master of Arts in History, English Linguistics and Ecclesiastical History, Basle University, 1978.
- PhD in Military History, Zurich University, 1994.
- Master of Arts in National Security Affairs, Naval Postgraduate School in Monterey (USA), 1976.
