= SCPT =

SCPT may refer to:

- Surveillance de la correspondance par poste et télécommunication
- Tom Clancy's Splinter Cell: Pandora Tomorrow
