= Roger Masson =

Swiss military officer (1894–1967)

Colonel-brigadier Roger Masson in 1931

Roger Masson (1 July 1894 – 19 October 1967) was a Swiss military officer who held the rank of Colonel-Brigadier. Masson joined the Swiss armed forces straight from university and rose rapidly through the ranks during the interwar period to become a member of the general staff. In 1931, he became co-editor and later editor of the "Swiss Military Review", a position he held until 1967. In 1935, he became a lecturer at the ETH Zurich. In 1936, he was put in command of the "Nachrichtendienstes der Schweiz", the military intelligence service of Switzerland.

During the World War II, there were two political groupings in Switzerland. The first group believed that if the country was attacked by the Allies, it would be best to take the lead to ensure an advantage. The other group, of which Masson was a member, believed that the Swiss army would fight any aggressor, so it was in the interest of the German Reich to ensure the country maintained its neutrality. In 1942, to ensure the Germans understood that Switzerland was seeking to remain neutral, Masson decided to meet with German SS officer Walter Schellenberg with the approval of General Henri Guisan and senior echelons. Schellenberg knew that a group close to Hitler wanted to invade Switzerland and he wanted assurances on the actions of the Swiss Army in the event of an Allied attack. When Guissan met Schellenberg, Guisan offered a statement that confirmed that should the Allies attack Switzerland, they would be attacked. This confirmed the question of Swiss neutrality for the Germans and removed the threat of invasion. After the war, Masson was investigated by a federal judge, who concluded that he was acting in the best interests of the country. Historical analysis of his actions concluded that Masson took unnecessary risks and could have been blackmailed, but it did settle the question of neutrality. What is often overlooked, is that Masson created an effective and professional military intelligence service during the interwar period.

== Life ==
Masson was born on 1 July 1894 in Zürich. He was the son of commercial director Jules Auguste and Eugénie Jeanneret. After completing his high school diploma and studying history at the University of Neuchâtel, Masson joined the Swiss Armed Forces, becoming an infantry soldier. In 1915, he was promoted to lieutenant. In 1922, Masson was promoted to Captain, becoming an infantry instructor and by 1927 had become a member of the general staff. In 1928, he attended ETH Zurich where he studied military science, before continuing study at the École supérieure de guerre (military education institute) in Paris. In 1931, Masson became a co-editor and later editor-in-chief of the Swiss Military Review (Revue militaire suisse), which is a Swiss publication devoted to security and defence policy issues, a position he held until 1967. In 1935, Masson became a lecturer in the ETH Zurich. At the same time, he was promoted Chief of Staff of Division 1.

== Swiss military intelligence organisation ==
In 1936, Masson was put in charge of section 5 of General staff, which constituted the military intelligence service of the Swiss armed forces. In the years leading up to the war, he attempted to rebuild the section that had been virtually dissolved during the interwar period. This happened due to a number of complex reasons that included personal problems, lack of understanding, the general staff disliked having an intelligence agency and the false belief in the security provided by the League of Nations as well as the false belief that peace-time sources of information would be available during a time of war or crises. With the approach of war, Chief of the Army General Staff Jakob Labhart issued an order on 22 February 1938 that contained instructions to rebuild army intelligence. Combined with an increased budget, it authorised Masson to form a strategic intelligence service, known as "Id". At the time, Masson recognised that Swiss Intelligence would no longer only offer intelligence on basic military facts but instead focus on all German operations. At the time that agency was still both underfunded and understaffed but it wasn't until the Munich crisis of August 1938 and the agencies successful intelligence operation that the Swiss Government recognised that it needed a well-funded intelligence service. Masson was able to use the money to open field-offices on the northern, western, and southern front as well as fund training for new agents as well as recruit new informants.

On the 1 March 1942, Masson was promoted to Assistant Chief of Staff with the rank of colonel-brigadier. In January 1944, group Id was expanded to include the territorial service and renamed Group "Ib". This resulted in Masson commanding a unit consisting of 300,000 men.

== Masson's contact with the German Reich ==
=== Origin of the Masson-Schellenberg contact ===
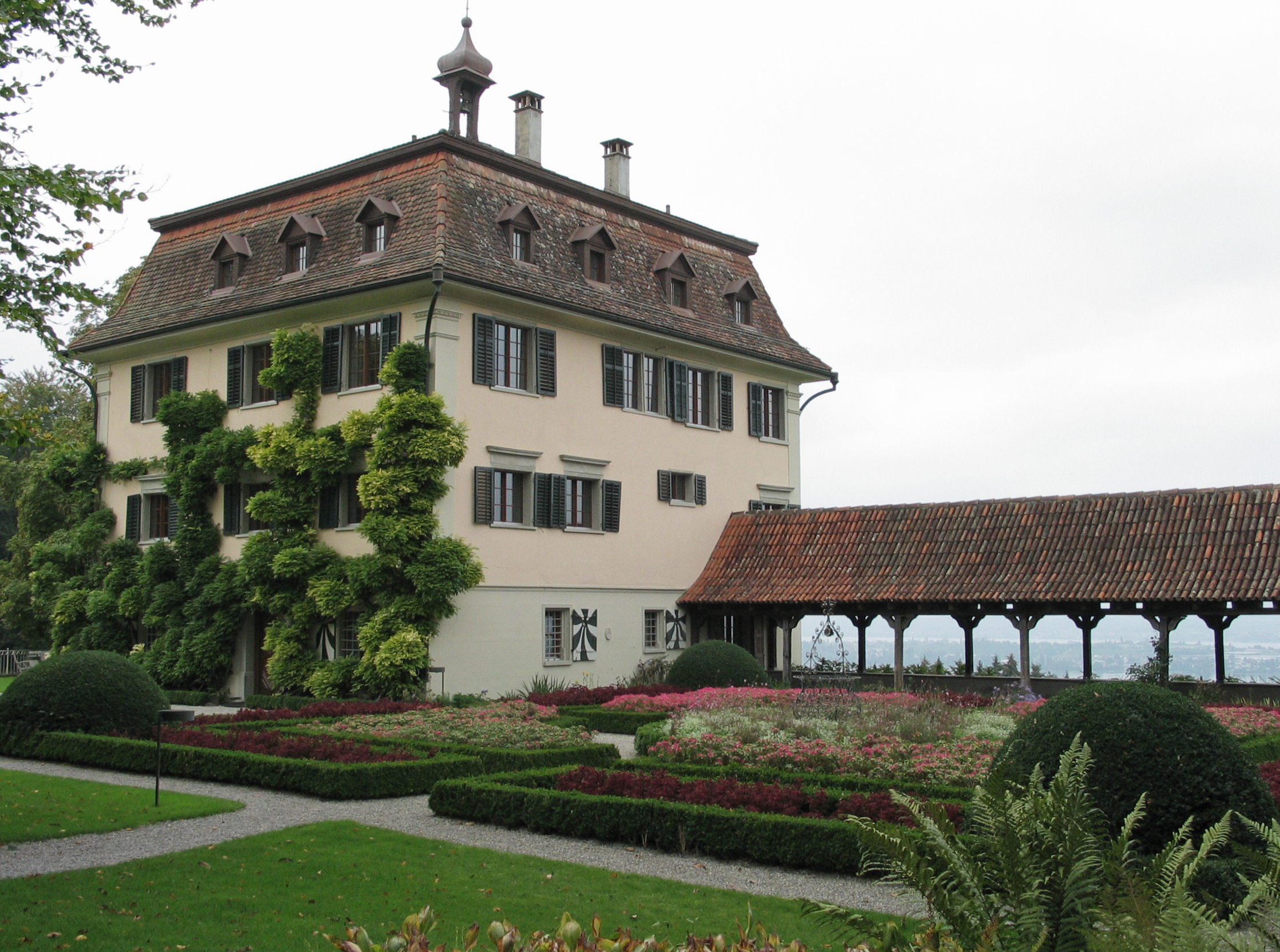
Wolfsberg Castle near Ermatingen, the residence of Paul Eduard Meyer from 1937 until his death in 1966

The first person who was directly involved in initiating the connection was Swiss lawyer and police fiction writer Paul Eduard Meyer. On 23 March 1938, Meyer purchased Wolfsburg Castle near Ermatingen, that would eventually be used to host the meetings between Masson and Schellenberg. On 29 August 1939, Meyer joined the Army and on 7 November 1939, Meyer was transferred to the army staff in Interlaken at the request of Roger Masson and promoted to the rank of captain, effectively to work in the Swiss intelligence service. Meyer's responsibility as a lawyer was to evaluate, view and forward the reports of the intelligence collection points as well as monitor the domestic political situation. One of these tasks was to observe the National Movement of Switzerland, a Nazi umbrella organization, which was to merge various Nazi organizations into a National Socialist Unity Party.

==== Business connections with Henry Guisan Jr. ====
In 1941, Captain Meyer was best man to Lieutenant Colonel Henri Guisan Jr., the son of General Henri Guisan, a Swiss military officer who held the office of General of the Swiss Armed Forces. General Guisan was pleased that Meyer was looking after his son. On 23 August 1941, General Guisan, appointed Meyer as his personal intelligence officer and also entrusted him with duties of his personal security. Guisan Jr. approached Meyer in the autumn of 1941 to ask his help in obtaining an entry visa for SS officer Hans-Wilhelm Eggen. Meyer succeeded in this in consultation with his superiors, Masson's deputy Werner Müller and Masson himself. The Federal Police Department issued the visa and Eggen left for Zürich on 30 October 1941. Eggen explained to him that Warenvertriebs-G.m.b.H., a procurement company for the SS, which he had founded on behalf of the SS, wanted to buy wooden barracks. Eggen had Extroc SA, a shareholding company founded in Lausanne on 29 August 1941, in mind as the seller. Guisan Jr. was a member of the board of Extroc SA, shareholders were the Basel merchants Rudolf Haenger sr. and Rudolf Walter Haenger Jr. 3,000 barracks were delivered to Warenvertriebs G.m.b.H., and Meyer represented first Extroc SA and later Warenvertriebs-G.m.b.H., receiving substantial fees from first one and then the other. The fee for the barracks amounted to 12 million francs, which was provided by the SS Main Economic and Administrative Office. This office required the approval of the head of foreign intelligence in Amt VI (Ausland-SD) of the Reich Security Main Office (RSHA), Brigadeführer Walter Schellenberg, to release the money. Eggen and Schellenberg had become close and often worked together. In doing so, Eggen avoided being subordinate to Schellenberg so that he would retain his personal independence, and remained in the SS-Führungshauptamt.

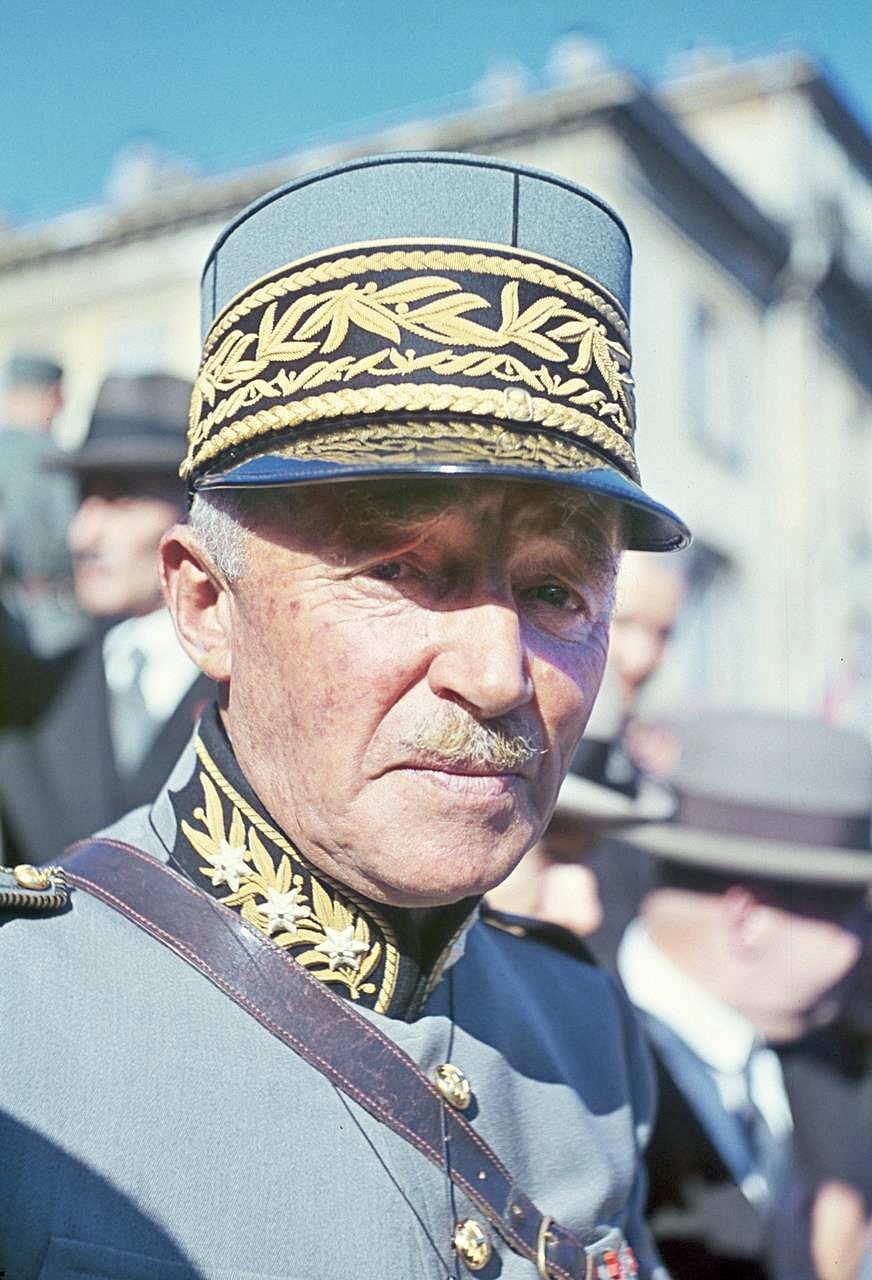
General Guisan in Visp VS, Switzerland, around 1942

==== German press campaign against Switzerland ====
In the autumn of 1941, German newspapers led a campaign against Switzerland accusing it for a "lack of neutrality". Masson therefore feared a pre-emptive attack on Switzerland. Another argument in favour of a pre-emptive attack was that of the Russian campaign, which had just begun in June 1941 and was still going well for Germany and the Nazi state still had strategic reserves available that could be used for invasion of Switzerland. Respect for Swiss sovereignty was not to be expected from Germany in the long term. It was basically not foreseen in Adolf Hitler's conception. Carl Schmitt, at the time the leading German jurist in international and constitutional law, described it as follows: The world is divided into Großräume, huge areas connected by history, economy, and culture. Each of these is dominated by one major imperial power. Germany, like every empire, has its own Großraum, into which its political ideas radiate and to which foreign intervention may not be exposed. In the order of these Großräume, the Großraumordnung, the leading people grant the people being led at most a graduated degree of autonomy. In the Großraum, there would be no sovereignty, no independence and no territorial integrity for the peoples being led.

==== First meetings of Masson and Eggen ====
Meyer was aware of his superior Masson's position and suggested that he talk to Eggen who might be able to help. Masson agreed and instructed Meyer to organise a meeting with Eggen. On 24 November 1941, Masson, Eggen, and Meyer met at the Hotel Schweizerhof in Bern. Eggen gave Masson the impression that he was friendly to Switzerland and was full of ideas, and more importantly, that he had access to key German figures. Masson decided to meet Eggen again because, in his eyes, he could arbitrate Germany's false impression of Switzerland. In early December 1941, Masson asked Eggen for the first favour, namely that Germany forbid the Nazi Swiss journalist and propagandist Franz Burri from publishing informational pamphlets produced by the International Presseagentur, inciting hostility against Switzerland. Burri claimed that General Guisan was under the influence of Jews, plutocrats and Freemasons and was a lackey of Anglo-Saxon politics. Eggen was able to fulfill Masson's wish with the help of his commanding officer, Hans Jüttner, the head of the SS Führungshauptamt, and the head of the SS-Hauptamt Gottlob Berger. In early December 1941, Masson reported his contacts with Eggen to the head of General Guisan's personal staff, Bernard Barbey. Barbey advised him to keep quiet about the contact.

==== Release of Ernst Mörgeli ====
In early 1942, Masson approached Eggen with a request to work toward the release of Ernst Mörgeli. Mörgeli (1914-2005) was a Swiss lawyer and officer with the rank of second lieutenant, who worked for the Swiss intelligence from 1940 to 1942. He was appointed to the Swiss consulate in Stuttgart, disguised in the role of secretary. However, he was betrayed and arrested by the Gestapo on the inaccurate charge of spying for Great Britain and sent to Welzheim concentration camp. Eggen truthfully stated that he did not have the influence to secure the release of Mörgeli. However, SS Brigadier and Major General of Police Walter Schellenberg, the head of Office VI (Ausland-SD ) in the Reich Security Main Office, the security service of Reichsführer SS, Heinrich Himmler, could possibly help. Masson knew nothing about Schellenberg, but suggested to Eggen that a private meeting be arranged with Schellenberg in Switzerland. Schellenberg sent word to Masson through Eggen that he had no time for a vacation in Switzerland, and invited Masson to Berlin. This, in turn, Masson declined. Schellenberg then invited Meyer to Berlin and received him on 8 July 1942, at an SS guesthouse on Wannsee.

==== Conversation between Schellenberg and Meyer on Lake Wannsee ====
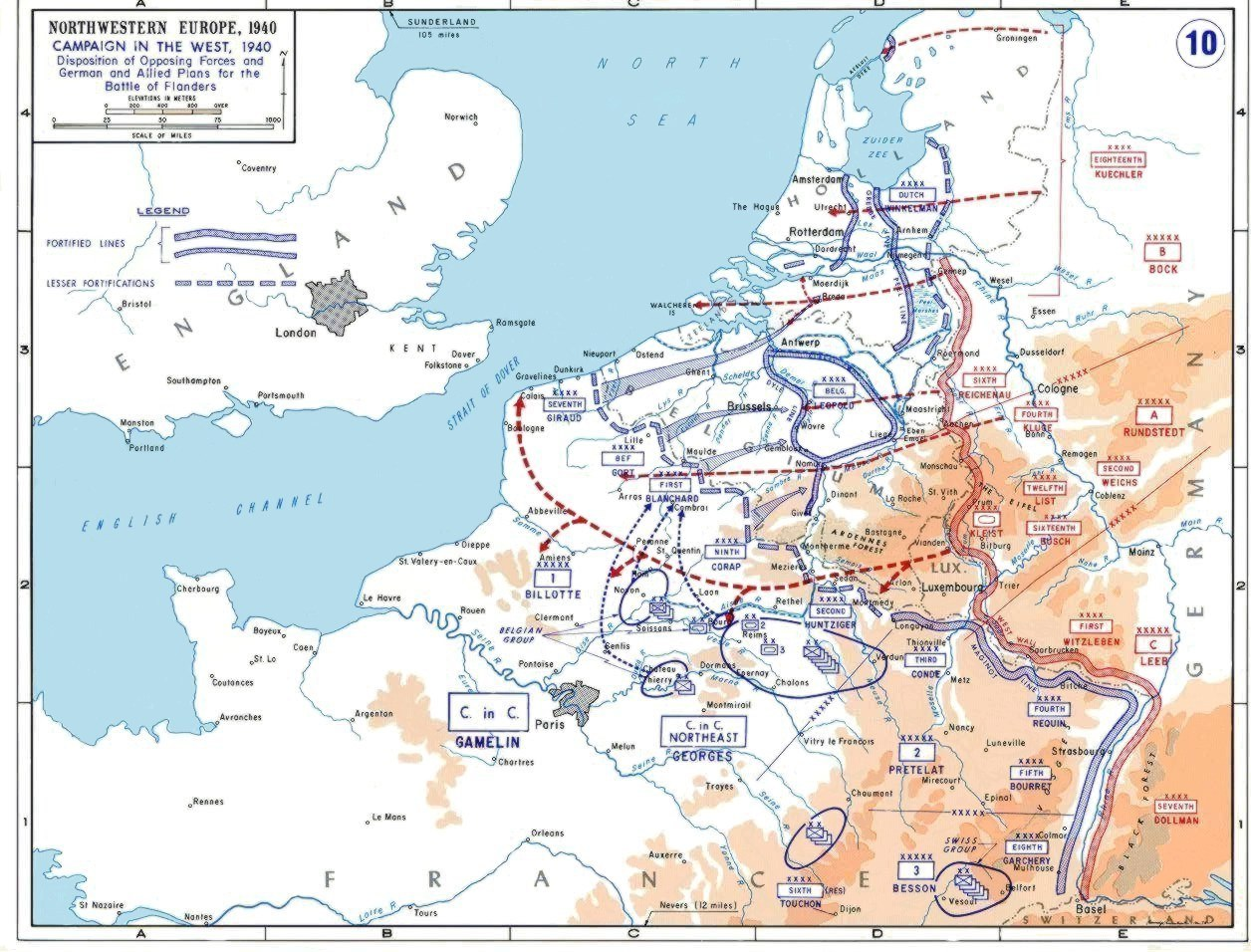
The course of Case Yellow. The French units on standby for "Plan H" are marked as "Swiss Group". (bottom right)

Schellenberg approached Meyer about the Charité-sur-Loire file archive papers, which raised doubts about Switzerland's neutrality. During the German Western campaign, files left behind in La Charité sur Loire and the Dampiere barracks in Dijon fell into the hands of advancing German soldiers on 19 June 1940. They contained details on Plan H, the plan on how France and Switzerland were to jointly repel a German attack along the Basel - Gempenplateau - Olten line. From the German side, the plans were denounced as a breach of neutrality and they were used as a means to pressure the Swiss. However, Plan H was not a violation of the law of neutrality because a neutral state that is attacked in violation of international law is allowed to defend itself like any other state and is free to enter into an alliance in doing so. Meyer replied to Schellenberg that it would be useful to meet with Masson. Masson was at great pains to portray the importance of Plan H as less than Germany perceived it. Schellenberg went on to address the unfriendly attitude of the Swiss press. Meyer stated that he could not influence this; freedom of the press was an essential part of the Swiss state system. Meyer asked Schellenberg to release Ernst Mörgeli. If Burri and his press agency were silenced and Mörgeli released, these were the two pillars on which the relationship could be built. However, Mörgeli was not to be released until later. Schellenberg reassured Meyer that Switzerland was not on Hitler's mind at the moment, since military matters were fully occupying his attention. Schellenberg and Meyer agreed that the German embassy in Switzerland would not have Himmler's and Hitler's ear, and that their talks were to be exclusively private conversations with no binding effect. The conversations were to be kept secret, but their respective superiors, Heinrich Himmler and Roger Masson, were to be informed.

=== Meeting between Masson and Schellenberg in Waldshut ===
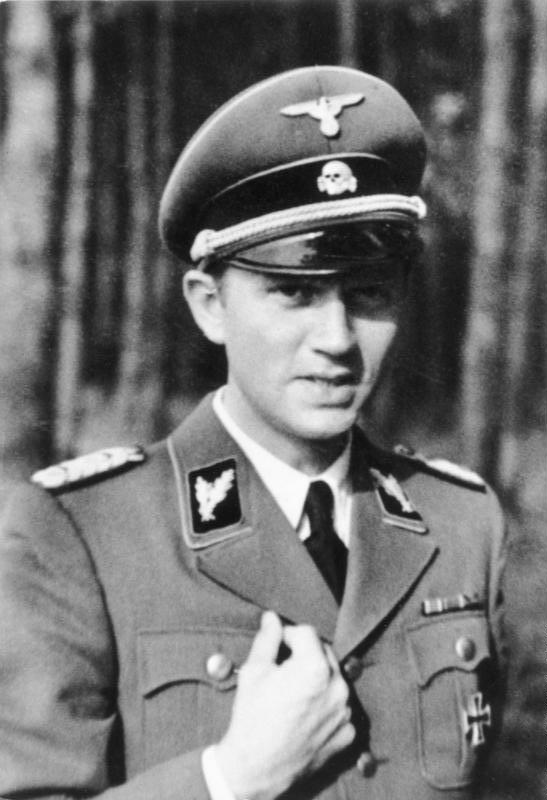
Walter Schellenberg

The first meeting between Masson and Schellenberg came about through a chance coincidence rather than a planned action when in July 1942, Werner Müller was invited to attend the International Criminal Police Commission in Berlin. In civilian life Müller was a policeman who directed the criminal investigation department in the city of Bern and had attended the commission several times before. He knew Reinhard Heydrich personally. Masson arranged for Müller to attend and assigned him four tasks, which were to establish contact with people associated with Heinrich Himmler, gauge the mood of the SS, try for the release of Ernst Mörgeli and discuss bilateral issues regarding the police. Müller arrived in Berlin on 8 July 1942 where he was met by Schellenberg in his house in Wannsee. Müller was told that "Switzerland was not a burning issue for the Führer". Müller mentioned Mörgeli, but couldn't pursue the matter further. On 9 July 1942, Müller returned to Switzerland to report. He considered the meeting a success, believing that he had established a trusted contact in Germany. The meeting was also considered a success by Schellenberg who arranged a return visit, sending Eggen to Zürich on 27 August 1942. Schellenberg sought to establish a private connection, essentially a special channel where trusted communication could be conducted that couldn't be addressed via diplomatic channels. Eggen met with Meyer at the Hotel Baur au Lac. While discussing the military situation, Eggen recommended that Masson should meet Schellenberg as soon as possible. Masson was originally hesitant but finally agreed. Until now, he said, it had been believed in Germany that Masson was in close touch with British intelligence. In the meantime, however, it had been recognized that Masson was a man who could be trusted on the German side. If Masson came into contact with Schellenberg, problems could be solved, which was not possible through the clogged diplomatic channels. Germany knew of no one in Switzerland with whom difficult questions could be approached in a friendly and trusting manner. Masson then instructed Meyer to prepare a meeting with Schellenberg. Masson reported his intention to Bernard Barbey, chief of General Guisan's personal staff. Masson's immediate superior, Chief of General Staff Jakob Huber, was unreachable as he was on leave. Later, Masson approached Guisan directly and reported his intention. Guisan expressed no objections. On 8 September 1942, Masson left Switzerland and travelled across the Rhine to meet Schellenberg at a restaurant at the Waldshut train station. As this was their first meeting together, both of the men worked to find common ground. Schellenberg began the conversation by claiming that Swiss intelligence was financed by the United States and that Masson was at the top of the wanted list. However, he, Schellenberg, was friendly towards Switzerland. Thereupon Schellenberg made concessions to Masson:

- Ernst Mörgeli would be released, which occurred on 4 December 1942. Mörgeli was flown out of Germany to Dübendorf accompanied by Eggen.
- Franz Burri would be induced to cease his smear campaigns. Schellenberg succeeded in this, but only for a few months.
- The head of the police department of the Justice and Police Department, Heinrich Rothmund, was to be given the entry visa to Germany that he had long been denied. Rothmund made use of this and traveled to Berlin for meetings from 12 October 1942 to 6 November 1962. At the end of January 1943, he submitted a detailed report to the Federal Council.
- Swiss nationals who wished to perform Swiss military service were to be allowed to leave for Switzerland.

On 6 January 6, 1943, Schellenberg issued "Meldung en den Führer 1'r. 52, "Message No. 52 to the Führer" titled: "About planned RAF bombings of Brenner pass and Swiss mobilization", stating that Switzerland would maintain its armed neutrality and strengthen its military protection. Schellenberg stated that Switzerland feared being drawn into the war because Italian resistance was falling. Already the British Royal Air Force intended to bomb the Brenner Pass in order to eliminate the important line of communication between the Axis powers. In this situation, the previous military protection of neutrality was no longer sufficient. Switzerland therefore intended to carry out another general mobilization in order to be ready for operations by the spring of 1943. The mobilization was purely defensive and directed against any invader. It was not a response to the occupation of southern France by German troops. It was only intended to prevent Switzerland from being drawn into the war by the occupation of large parts of Italy.

=== Guisan and Schellenberg meeting in Biglen and Arosa ===
On 25 December 1942, Eggen contacted Meyer and informed him that Schellenberg wanted to spend a week in a chalet and that he wanted to settle the general situation with Masson and General Guisan in a way that favoured Switzerland. Lieutenant Colonel Werner Müller used a reorganization of the defence to hand Meyer over to the intelligence service. Müller had long considered him a harmful schemer who couldn't keep things to himself and liked to meddle in matters outside his remit On 20 January 1943, Meyer was appointed head of the intelligence service at the Zürich branch of Intelligence Collection Point 1 in Lucerne. However, at the instigation of Max Waibel, the head of Intelligence Collection Point 1, Captain Eugen Gyr became head of the branch office, which Meyer took as an affront. However, despite his transfer from Interlaken to Zürich, Meyer remained partly directly subordinate to General Guisan. Masson also reserved the right to ask Max Waibel to call on Meyer for special assignments, which included contact with Eggen and Schellenberg. In these matters, Meyer Waibel was not required to report. On 27 January 1943, Meyer told General Guisan about Schellenberg's travel plans in a private conversation. Meyer recommended that Guisan firmly and unflinchingly declare to the Germans that Switzerland would be equally defended against Western and Axis incursions, even if Italy were drawn into conflicts. Guisan agreed to meet Schellenberg because, in his view, the German Reich was not convinced of this determination.

On 2 March 1943, Schellenberg entered Switzerland via Kreuzlingen. The meeting was originally supposed to take place on 3 March 1943 at the Hotel Schweizerhof in Bern. However, Guisan chose the Bären inn in Biglen because there was less risk of being recognized. Schellenberg explained to Guisan that it would be difficult for Germany to attack Switzerland. The Fuhrer's headquarters also advised against it, but one always had to fear the worst with Hitler. Guisan was to declare in writing that Switzerland would resist any attack, including that of the Western Allies trying to get behind German lines from the south. Guisan replied in an unfriendly tone that an attack on Switzerland would not be easy. On 4 March 1943, Schellenberg and Eggen drove to Arosa to meet General Guisan again. Guisan gave Schellenberg a written statement stating that the Swiss army would treat anyone invading Switzerland as an enemy. In agreement with Hitler, in April 1943 Foreign Minister Joachim von Ribbentrop authorized the head of Office VI of the RSHA, Schellenberg, to reply orally to Commander-in-Chief Guisan as follows:

"Germany welcomes Switzerland's decision to defend its neutrality at all costs. Berlin is of the opinion that Switzerland's intention to defend its Alpine passes against an attack from the south need not be realised. Indeed, the Axis powers are determined to drive the English and Americans out of the Mediterranean area".

On June 22, 1943, Ribbentrop suggested to Hitler that he weaken the wording about the expulsion of the British and Americans and only talk about preventing them from landing on the European continent.

=== False alarm and fake rescue ===
Beginning in November 1942, Message Center 1, an intelligence service monitoring and collection centre located at the Hotel Schweizerhof in Lucerne received several messages that Germany intended to attack Switzerland. They did not cause any particular concern, since an attack was unlikely. On 18 March 1943, Intelligence Collection Point 1 received word that Germany intended to attack Switzerland no later than 6 April 1943, with one million men and an additional 100,000 paratroopers. The Viking informant had access to the highest levels of the Wehrmacht and had proved reliable in the past. The following day, Masson telephoned Meyer about this news. On 20 March 1943, Meyer told Eggen by telephone that he was worried about the invasion reports from the Reich. Eggen truthfully assured Meyer that he had heard only good things so far [from Schellenberg]. There was no cause for alarm, he said, everything was fine in Berlin. Eggen reported the conversation to Schellenberg, and both developed a story with which to place themselves in an even more favorable light with Masson. On 22 March 1943, Meyer and Eggen spoke again by telephone at 3 p.m., and Eggen announced that he would arrive at the Basel Badischer Bahnhof the next day. At 5 p.m., News Gathering Point 1 reported to Masson that it had been decided at Führer headquarters not to attack Switzerland. The reason was presumably the low reserves of the German Reich. However, there was no plan to attack Switzerland in 1943, and there was no discussion at the Führer's headquarters on this subject. However, this was not known in Switzerland. In 1954 at the earliest, Hans-Rudolf Kurz was able to determine, after making inquiries in Germany, that there was no German plan to attack Switzerland in 1943. On the morning of 23 May 1943, Masson instructed Meyer by telephone to inquire personally with Eggen whether the attack order had indeed been called off.Meyer then drove to the Badischer Bahnhof in Basel. There he told Eggen, "We were informed about the planned attack on Switzerland; yesterday it was called off." Eggen then told the ignorant Meyer a tall tale concocted with Schellenberg: the attack had been scheduled for 25 March 1943. It had been Schellenberg who had tried to dissuade Hitler. After the meeting, Schellenberg had called him and said, "Now everything is lost!" With the help of Himmler and Ribbentrop, he then succeeded in changing Hitler's mind and reversing the decision to attack. In fact, Hitler had not called Schellenberg in for a lecture in all of 1943. On 24 March. Masson, Meyer, and Eggen met in Zürich, and Eggen told Masson the fabricated the story of the canceled attack.

==== Further concessions by Schellenberg ====
Eggen then asked Masson to send a letter of thanks to Schellenberg and to accept an invitation from Schellenberg to visit Berlin, where he would introduce him to Heinrich Himmler. Masson agreed to the visit, but the Federal Council rejected the travel request. Instead, Meyer was sent to Berlin on 28 July 1943. Schellenberg remained friendly to Switzerland. He turned over to Masson the family members of French General Henri Giraud, who had escaped from Königstein Fortress after being in German captivity. Masson attached particular importance to this because Giraud had been his instructor at the École supérieure de guerre. Masson brought the family back to France. Schellenberg wanted to be able to point to active remorse in the expected proceedings, which had a mitigating effect on the punishment.

==== Meyer narrative ====
On 29 March 1943, Meyer was at Army Headquarters in Interlaken when he met his superior Max Waibel, head of Intelligence Collection Point 1 in Lucerne. He explained to Waibel that his Viking informant was reliable and that he had checked this himself in Berlin. Waibel reported this conversation in writing to the head of counter-intelligence, Werner Müller, who was also Masson's deputy. Waibel called Schellenberg dishonest towards Switzerland and towards Masson for failing to warn of the impending attack. Waibel had no way of knowing that no attack was planned. On 30 March, Meyer went to see his former direct superior, the head of the counterintelligence service, Werner Müller, and told him something similar to what he had said to Waibel. Müller wrote to Masson about this conversation on 2 April 1943 and said that Meyer considered himself the savior of the fatherland and posed as the inspector and assessor of the intelligence service. Müller no longer wished to see Meyer at army headquarters, and would have opposed his transfer.

=== Disagreements within the intelligence department ===
On 11 March 1943, the liaison officer between the Federal Military Department and the Commander-in-Chief of the Armed Forces, Major Hans Bracher, informed Federal Councillor Karl Kobelt about Schellenberg's conversation in Biglen. Kobelt brought the matter before the Federal Council as a collegial body. The latter informed General Henri Guisan that it was incomprehensible that the commander-in-chief should contact and make political statements to high-ranking officers of a belligerent state. Max Waibel, the head of Intelligence Section 1 and his superior, Alfred Ernst, head of the German desk of the intelligence department, both considered Masson's positions to be untenable, asked the Chief of the Army Staff, Jakob Huber to transfer them out of the Intelligence. Ernst believed that SS leaders were exerting a malign influence on the Intelligence department. Waibel withdrew the request and remained in his post. Hans Hausamann of Büro Ha, approached Federal Councillor Kobelt directly on 4 April 1943, and recommended that he have Brigadier Colonel Wacker of Mountain Brigade 12 and Masson swap posts. The inquiry with Schellenberg as to whether an attack on Switzerland was imminent, he said, had tipped Himmler off, that there was a leak in Hitler's entourage. The impression was created in Intelligence Collection Point 1 that sources of intelligence also had to be protected from Masson. The parts of the intelligence service that were concerned with Germany split into two camps and instead of showing mutual respect to each other, a tendency to disintegrate into argument became apparent.

== Daily Telegraph interview ==
On 28 September 1945, Masson gave an interview to The Daily Telegraph where he explained how Hitler had wanted to attack Switzerland with 30 divisions, and how his confidant Schellenberg dissuaded him from this order after a heated debate on 19 March 1943. The Swiss press as a group, reacted angrily, first because a foreign newspaper was the first to interview Masson. Moreover, journalists well remembered how Masson accused some newspapers during the war for not being objective, thus provoking the German Reich.

=== Parliamentary reaction ===
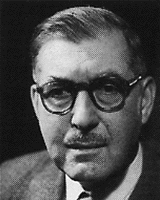
Karl Kobelt

Masson had neither asked the Federal Council, which was responsible for foreign policy, for permission to conduct the interview nor warned it in advance. The Federal Council therefore had to take a position on Masson's statements in a hurry. Federal Councilor Kobelt called the interview at least tactless, if not an official misconduct. On 1 October 1945, National Councillors Eugen Dietschi of Basel and Walther Bringolf of Schaffhausen addressed a parliamentary question to the Federal Council as to whether the story was true and whether Masson wanted to save Schellenberg and other SS greats from the Nuremberg trials. Federal Councillor Karl Kobelt's answer essentially reproduced Masson's statements. Masson would have had the good intention of serving his country and would not have pursued any self-serving secondary intentions. However, Masson would be held accountable for the interview; his conduct was already being investigated. At the same meeting, Kobelt made an early report on the military vulnerability of Switzerland in World War II, but only with material from the Military Department that had to be compiled ahead of time. The report of the entire Federal Council was originally scheduled for December 1945. For the Federal Military Department and its head, Karl Kobelt, the response was further complicated by the fact that conflicting statements had been submitted. The head of the Basel Political Police, Wilhelm Lützelschwab, considered Masson's action wrong and dangerous. The commander-in-chief of the army, General Guisan, considered Masson's behaviour probably very useful, and stated that Masson had informed him of all steps. However, the National Councilors and the press were equally satisfied with Kobelt's comprehensive information. General Guisan stated again in 1948, in a speech to the Association Romande et Francophone de Berne et Environs (ARB), that Masson's behavior was useful, and received loud applause.

=== Administrative investigation ===
Kobelt asked Federal Judge Louis Couchepin to conduct an administrative investigation of Masson. The final question of the investigation order was: Was Masson's connection to Schellenberg legal, questionable or illegal? On 8 March 1946, the Federal Military Department published an abridged version of what later became known as the "Couchepin Report". Masson was essentially rehabilitated: Brigadier Colonel Masson began and maintained his association with SS General Schellenberg with the consent and approval of his military superiors. Even if one disputes that his association was permissible and useful, it should be recognized that he acted with the good intention of serving his country. The investigation revealed that he did not give information to foreign countries that became detrimental to Switzerland. On the contrary, Masson endeavored to remove difficulties in the relations of the two countries. It was found that he did not seek personal advantage by the connection, nor did he have any advantages. His probity was not impaired. It was objected to by the head of the Federal Department of Justice and Police, and reprimanded by Masson's military superior, that he exceeded his jurisdiction when he crossed the border into Germany without authorisation. This matter is therefore closed. Notwithstanding this, it must still be punished that he gave an interview that was incompatible with his official duties. In accordance with the demand of Federal Judge Couchepin, he received a reprimand for this.

== Letter of support to the American Military Tribunal ==
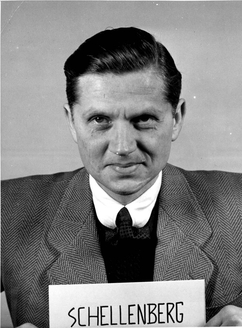
An image of Walter Schellenberg taken between 1946 and 1949

On 10 May 10, 1948, Masson wrote a letter in support of Schellenberg before the American military tribunal, the contents of which were confirmed by General Guisan. Schellenberg, he said, was a patriot who regretted that Hitler's Germany had rushed into World War II. Schellenberg had known even before losing the Battle of Stalingrad that the war would end in German defeat. His influence, however, had been too slight, so he had not known what to do. Schellenberg's benevolent attitude towards Switzerland had been altruistic; he had not wanted to curry favor with the victors.

The American military tribunal followed a similar line of thought. In its judgment of 11 April 1949, it wrote in a section entitled "Exclusion of Guilt and Mitigating Circumstances" on sentencing:

"Schellenberg had a share in helping some who were imprisoned, oppressed or persecuted in the Third Reich. The assistance was timely and substantial and directly alleviated the distress of the persecuted. The court considers it irrelevant whether Schellenberg acted out of compassion or to secure advantages with the already recognizable victors of the war. His motives did not affect those he helped. The court does not wish to deny him merit where he helped.".

== Historical analysis ==
=== Analysis of the intelligence service ===
In 1972, military historian Hans-Rudolf Kurz published "Nachrichtenzentrum Schweiz: Die Schweiz im Nachrichtendienst des Zweiten Weltkriegs" ("Intelligence Centre Switzerland: Switzerland in the Intelligence Service of the Second World War") in which he conducted a historical analysis of the Swiss intelligence service. Kurz examines the claims of General Guisan and Chief of Staff General Jakob Huber that the intelligence service was established in a remarkably short time and was able to collect a significant amount of intelligence. Kurz concludes at the end of the book that the intelligence service passed the acid test during World War II.

=== Contact with Schellenberg ===
From 1959 to 1967, Masson himself published 15 articles in Swiss newspapers in which he tried to explain himself and attempt to justify his actions. In 1969, Hans Hausamann had the journalist Alphons Matt compile a book of recollections titled "Zwischen allen Fronten. Der Zweite Weltkrieg aus der Sicht des Büro Ha" (Between all fronts. The Second World War from the Perspective of the Ha Office) without any scientific pretensions, mainly using the reports of his intelligence bureau, the Büro Ha. In the book, Hausamann reaffirms his view from September 1943, simply that Masson could have put himself in danger of being blackmailed and exploited by Schellenberg and other leading Nazis. In contrast, Hausamann considered the release of Mörgeli as only a minor success.

In his monograph "Nachrichtenzentrum Schweiz", Kurz acknowledged that Masson strove to invalidate the La Charitè file archive, in a way that that could have destroyed confidence in Swiss neutrality. In retrospect, there had been a risk in Masson's behavior that fortunately did not materialise. Otherwise, Masson would not have been spared a serious reproach.

In 1974, Swiss historian and archivist Daniel Bourgeois published his doctoral dissertation "Le Troisième Reich et la Suisse, 1933-1941" ("The Third Reich and Switzerland: 1933-1941"). The thesis examined the entire policy of the Third Reich toward Switzerland and devoted a special section to Swiss-French contingency planning and the connection between Masson and Schellenberg. Bourgeois stated that it made sense for Masson to see that the question of Swiss neutrality as the central aspect of the German-Swiss relationship during the Nazi period, as it addressed the dual policy of the Nazis. Namely on one hand, a sovereign Switzerland suited Hitler in military terms as long as it was neutral; on the other, Hitler wouldn't tolerate any other sovereign states in the Germanic region in the long run as Nazi ideology would lead it to conquer Switzerland.

In 2003, Swiss historian Pierre Th. Braunschweig published the monograph, "The Secret Wire to Berlin" where he examined the connection between Masson and Schellenberg. In the book, Braunschweig argues that Masson underestimated the risks in exceeding his authority. He also points out that Masson succeeded in building up the intelligence service from nothing and transforming it into a large, effective institution and that achievement is often overlooked.

== Book citation ==
- Matt, Alphons (1969). Zwischen allen Fronten. Der Zweite Weltkrieg aus der Sicht (in German). Frauenfeld: Huber.

== Bibliography ==
- Bourgeois, Daniel (1974). Le Troisième Reich et la Suisse, 1933-1941 [The Third Reich and Switzerland, 1933–1941] (phd thesis) (in French). Neuchâtel: Éditions de la Baconnière, University of Geneva. Graduate University Institute of International Studies.
- Baerentzen, Lars (2022). "A rarely used source for the "phoney war". The secret french documents found by german soldiers at La Charité-Sur-Loire on june 19th, 1940". Romanian Intelligence Studies Review. 27. National Institute for Intelligence Studies: 88–107.
- Braunschweig, Pierre (2004). Secret channel to Berlin : the Masson-Schellenberg connection and Swiss intelligence in World War II. Philadelphia: Casemate. ISBN 1-932033-39-4. OCLC 53823206.
- Diner, Dan (1989). "Rassistisches Völkerrecht" (PDF). Vierteljahrshefte für Zeitgeschichte (in German). 37 (1). Munich: Institut für Zeitgeschichte: 23–56.
- Rapp, Georges (1967). "Colonel-brigadier Roger Masson : rédacteur en chef de la "Revue Militaire Suisse" depuis 1931" [Colonel-Brigadier Roger Masson: editor-in-chief of the "Swiss Military Review" since 1931]. Revue Militaire Suisse (in French). 112 (9).
- G.P. (2 March 1946). "Du nouveau sur le cas Masson" [News on the Masson case] (PDF). Feuille d'Avis de Neuchatel (in French). No. 50. Neuchâtel. p. 1.
- Gruchmann, Lothar (1962). Nationalsozialistische Großraumordnung : Die Konstruktion einer "deutschen Monroe-Doktrin. Schriftenreihe der Vierteljahrshefte für Zeitgeschichte (in German). Vol. 4. Stuttgart: Oldenbourg Wissenschaftsverlag. ISBN 9783486703801.
- Kurz, Hans Rudolf (1972). Nachrichtenzentrum Schweiz: Die Schweiz im Nachrichtendienst des Zweiten Weltkriegs [Swiss Intelligence Center: Switzerland's role in the intelligence service of the Second World War] (in German). Frauenfeld: Huber. ISBN 978-3-7193-0439-3.
- Matt, Alphons (1969). Zwischen allen Fronten. Der Zweite Weltkrieg aus der Sicht des Büros Ha [Between all fronts. The Second World War from the Perspective of the Ha Office] (3rd ed.). Frauenfeld and Stuttgart: Huber.
- Rossé, Christian (2006). Le Service de renseignements suisse face à la menace allemande, 1939-1945 [The Swiss Intelligence Service facing the German threat, 1939-1945]. Panazol: Lavauzelle. ISBN 2-7025-1285-2.
- Riklin, Alois (November 2010). "Neutrality". Historisches Lexikon der Schweiz [Historical Dictionary of Switzerland] (in French). Bern: Swiss Academy of Humanities and Social Sciences, Swiss Historical Society.
- Scherrer, Adrian (29 May 2007). "Matt, Alphons". Historisches Lexikon der Schweiz (in German). Swiss Academy of Humanities and Social Sciences.
- Sidler, Roger (24 July 2007). "Ernst Mörgeli". Historisches Lexikon der Schweiz [Historical Dictionary of Switzerland] (in French). Bern: Swiss Academy of Humanities and Social Sciences, Swiss Historical Society.
- Walz, Gustav Adolf (1942). Völkerrechtsordnung und Nationalsozialismus, Untersuchungen zur Erneuerung des Völkerrechts Völkerrechtsordnung und Nationalsozialismus, Untersuchungen zur Erneuerung des Völkerrechts [International Legal Order and National Socialism, Studies on the Renewal of International Law International Legal Order and National Socialism, Studies on the Renewal of International Law] (in German). Munich: Franz Eher Nachfolger.
- de Weck, Hervé (15 December 2009). "Roger Masson". Dizionario storico della Svizzera (in Italian).
- de Weck, Hervé (21 October 1967). "Mort du colonel Masson ancien chef des services secrets" [Death of Colonel Masson, former head of the secret service]. Louis Dreyfus. Le Monde.
