= Hans Hausamann =

Swiss photographer and intelligence officer

Ernst Johann Hausamann (informally Hans Hausamann; 6 March 1897 – 17 December 1974) was a Swiss photographer and businessman who later became an intelligence officer.

Hausamann's father was a photographer, and when Hausamann grew up he became an amateur photographer himself. He joined the Swiss Militia during World War I and this established his political character. He was initially opposed to left-wing politics and supported a strong military. After the war, he opened a specialist photography business and published an associated magazine, that eventually led the company to work for the Swiss press. During the early 1930s, he worked in the militia's education film service, where he created films that promoted a strong military. With the approach of Nazism, Hausamann was initially sympathetic to the Third Reich but realised the danger to Swiss sovereignty and began to resist. In 1935, he began offering his press service to the Swiss Militia with a focus on military intelligence. In 1936, the General staff sent Hausamann for military training at the Prussian Staff College in Berlin. In 1939, he became the defence policy advisor to the Social Democratic Party of Switzerland. In the lead up to the war, he recognised that the militia lacked a competent military intelligence agency and this led to the founding the Büro Ha, an intelligence agency that was established in September 1939, disguised as a press cuttings agency.

In July 1940, Hausamann established the Officers League together with Alfred Ernst, Max Waibel and August R. Lindt, an organisation designed to offer unconditional resistance to the Nazis. This was in response to speech by Marcel Pilet-Golaz, that referenced the coming of an authoritarian regime in Switzerland. When it was dissolved by Henri Guisan, Hausamann along with August R. Lindt, created the secret paramilitary organization "Aktion Nationaler Widerstand", a civilian organisation designed to strengthen the militia against Nazism.

After the war, he lectured on military history at University of St. Gallen. He returned to working in his business and as a keen horse rider, established a number of horse riding tournaments.

== Life ==
Hausamann was the son of the photographer Ernst Gottfried Hausamann (1871-1958) and his wife Erika Neuhauser (married 1923) who was the daughter of the textile industrialist Emil Neuhauser. His father owned a photographic studio and was a noted photographer who developed new techniques. In June 1901 the family moved to the small village of Heiden. Hausamann attended schools in Heiden and Lausanne. After school and seeking independence, he became an amateur photographer.

He died on 17 December 1974 in Orselina.

== Career ==
During World War I, Hausamann attained the rank of leutnant. After the war, he became a radical opponent of the left and publicly supported a strong military in Switzerland. In 1925, he established a photographic business known as Hausamann & Co. AG, opened two shops in St. Gallen and Zürich that had associated laboratories for processing film. The company offered a mail-order facility, that was considered the first in Switzerland. As part of the service he published a bi-monthly magazine, that led to him offering services to the Swiss press. In this manner he moved from dealing strictly in photograph to dealing in information.

He was head of the Swiss Army Educational Film Service. Up until 1936, Hausamann worked as the press chief for the Schweizerische Offiziersgesellschaft (Swiss Officers Society), an umbrella organisation established in Switzerland to promote an efficient Swiss Army (SOG). As the press officer, he built up a press service to counter widespread anti-militarism and defeatism in the Swiss Army and to create a renewed, united and resilient Switzerland. On behalf of the SOG, he led the referendum campaign in favour of the "Wehrvorlage" (draft bill) to extend service in the army, which was adopted in 1935. With the arrival of National Socialism in the early 1930s, Hausamann was initial sympathetic to the Third Reich, but changed his mind. He recognised how Nazism endangered popular sovereignty and ethnic state-building because it wanted a German-ethnic unitary state, to the exclusion of Switzerland. In 1936, the General staff sent Hausamann for military training at the Prussian Staff College in Berlin. In 1938, on the initiative of Swiss politician and trade unionist Hans Oprecht, he became defence policy advisor to the Social Democratic Party of Switzerland. Hausamann produced films and organised around 1,600 educational lectures up until 1940.

=== Büro Ha ===
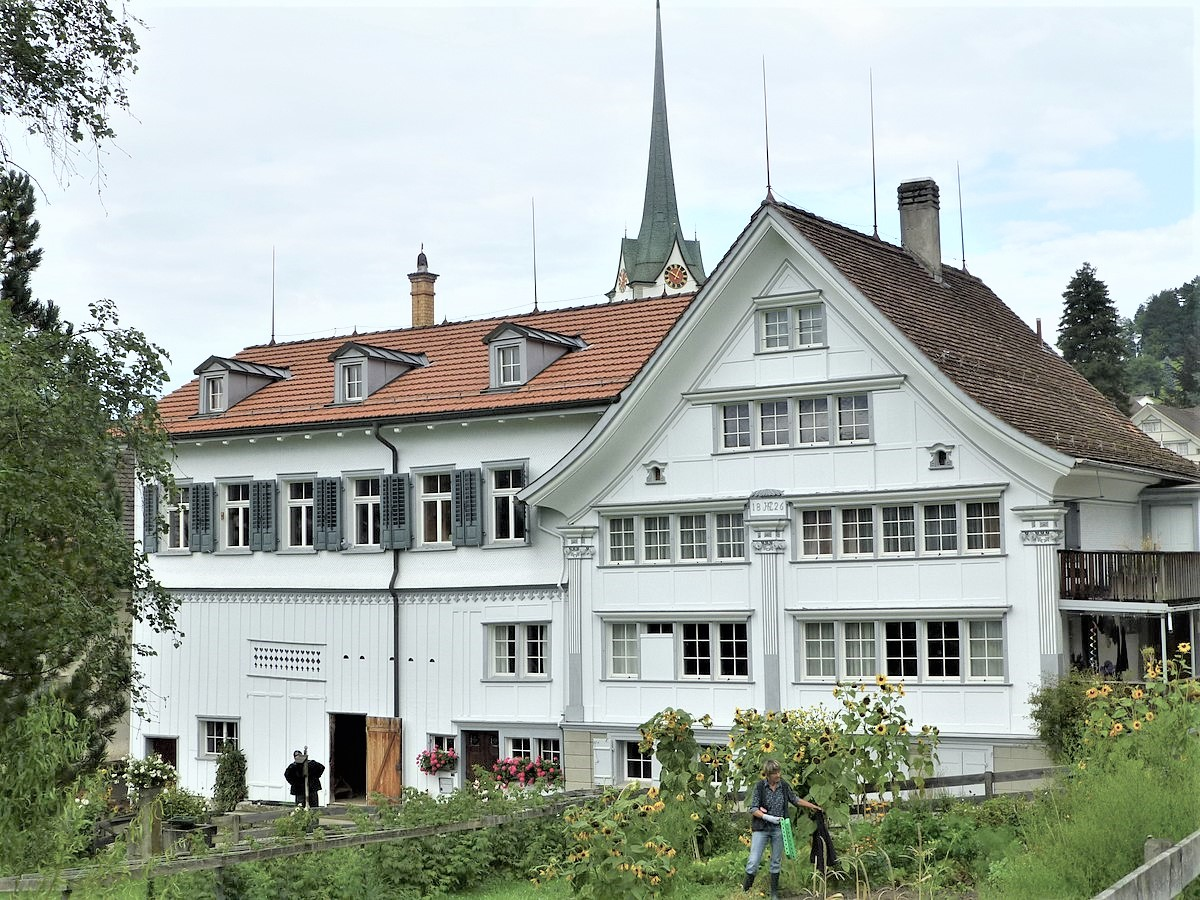
The office of Ha in Teufen, Hechtstrasse

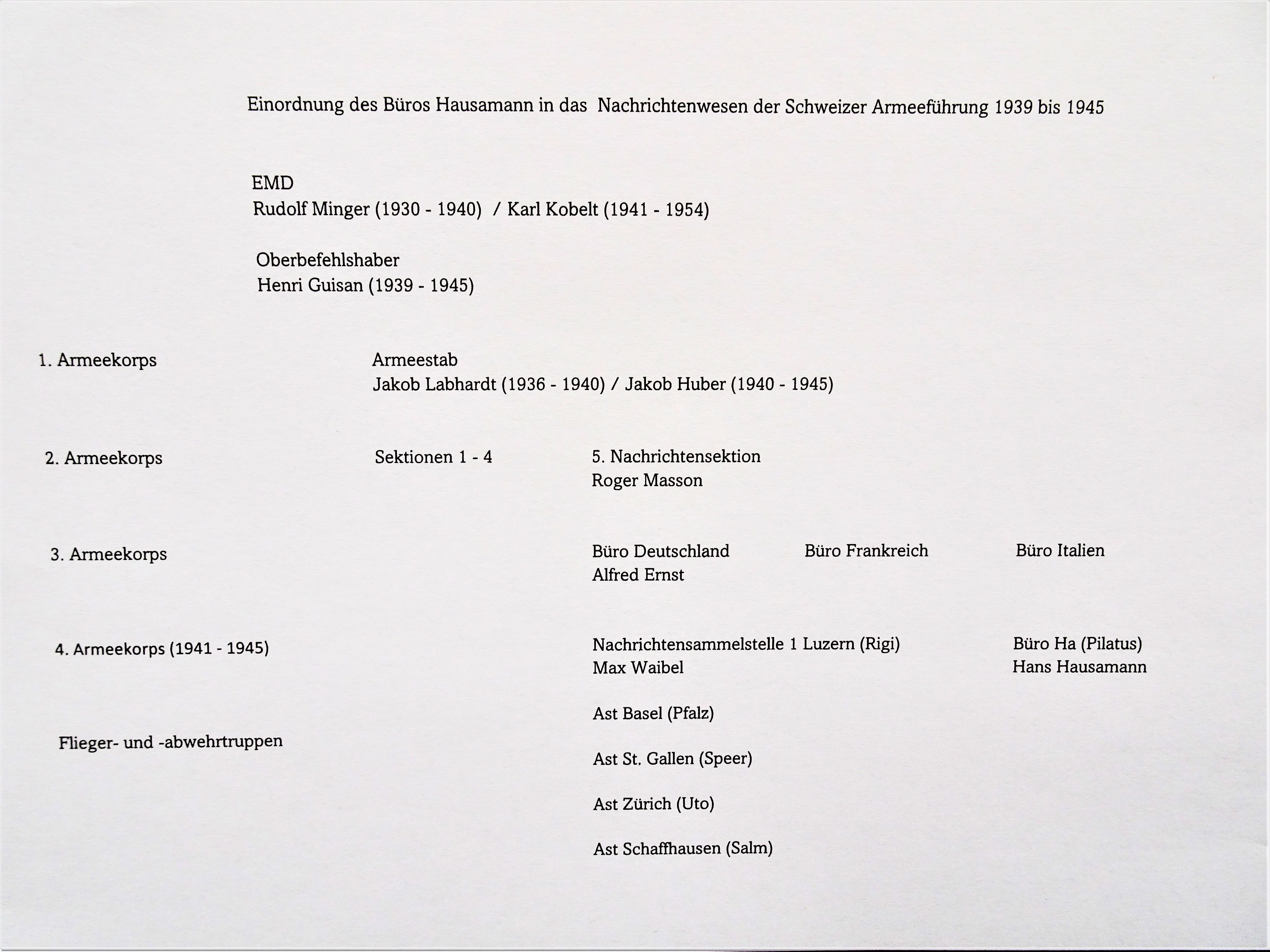
Hausamann in the military hierarchy of the Swiss intelligence service

Hausamann specialised his press service in military intelligence gathering from 1935 onwards as he offered his press service to the military. He recognised that the Swiss military was lacking a competent military agency and suitable sources to drive it, at a time when Switzerland itself was teeming with foreign agents of many nationalities. He established as an independent agency as he feared the during the period that led up to the war and in the event of a war, that the official intelligence agency, the Swiss Army Intelligence would be too small to defend Switzerland. In September 1939, he founded the new agency known as Büro Ha with an office that was set up in Teufen by the Swiss Militia. The agency was a covert arm of Swiss Intelligence, disguised as a press-cuttings agency. The agency was designed to develop the Swiss defence force and at the same time enable the Swiss to maintain the dubious claim of neutrality. In 1939-1940, Hausamann's office was moved to the Villa Stutz in Horw-St. Niklausen south of Lucerne. Against the resistance of the intelligence section of the army staff, Hausamann later succeeded in finding accommodation in the Hotel Schweizerhof in Lucerne, where the radio intercept station Noehrichtenstelle I that was commanded by Max Waibel, was already located. The radio equipment remained in Teufen, and a telex connection was added. Hausamann's office consisted of Hausamann himself, two women from the Women's Auxiliary Service, a radio operator and an office orderly who was also a driver. Haussaman was assisted in the agency by military intelligence officer, Czech colonel Karel Sedlacek, who was with the Czech government-in-exile in Switzerland.

Hausamann reported to the 5th Section of the Army Staff, of which Brigadier Roger Masson. of the Swiss General Staff, who was chief of Swiss wartime intelligence. Hausamann maintained nominal control of Büro Ha, managing the small group on a day-to-day basis, the agency was under the direct control by Masson. Outside the official channels, Hausamann reported directly to the head of the Federal Military Department, Karl Kobelt and to General Henri Guisan.

Hausamann's reports have been preserved in their entirety and are stored and available for consultation in chronological order in the Swiss Federal Archives. Copies are available at the Institute of Contemporary History in Munich.

=== News sources ===
From 1939, one of his most important suppliers of news from the German Reich became the owner of the small publishing house "Vita Nova", Rudolf Roessler. At Easter 1939, Hausamann met Xaver Schnieper in Lugano and later told him that he was active in the Swiss intelligence service outside of his job as a photo dealer. Schnieper shared Hausamann's basic political convictions and arranged for his student friend Franz Wallner to work with him. Hausamann gave Wallner assignments such as reconnoitring traffic over the Brenner Pass and considered him suitable for a permanent position in his private intelligence service. He asked him to come to Switzerland and initially let him stay with him in Teufen. Later Wallner moved to Lucerne and moved into the flat of the couple Annemarie and Xaver Schnieper.

Hausamann turned to Schnieper again and asked him for a reliable informant who was familiar with German conditions. Schnieper suggested an acquaintance he had met in Berlin in 1933 while still a student, who was Roessler, who had acquired basic military knowledge as a war volunteer during World War I, although he was never promoted. Roessler agreed to cooperate, but avoided meeting Hausamann personally. Hausamann used Wallner, who lived in Lucerne, as an intermediary, and from the summer of 1939 to May 1943 he passed on to him news that Roessler had obtained from Germany. Hausamann received 80-130 individual reports a month from Roessler through Wallner.

Roessler did not work exclusively for Hausamann, however. From the late summer of 1942 onwards regularly, he sent his reports and analyses to Rachel Dübendorfer through the cut-out Christian Schneider. Dübendorfer and Schneider were part of the Red Three ("Rote Drei"), a Soviet espionage group that was run by Alexander Radó. The group operated in Switzerland and had strong ties to other Soviet espionage groups in Germany, France, Belgium and the Low Countries. Roessler gave no information about his German and other sources, despite the GRU's insistence. Roessler's secrecy paid off after German authorities were able to intercept and decipher radio traffic between the GRU and Rote Drei from the summer of 1943. The authorities were unable to draw a conclusion about Roessler's German sources.

Roessler's value to the Red Three and the Soviets derived entirely from his sources in Germany. This context is probably misleading, as the CIA believed that the German sources gave their intelligence to Swiss General Staff i.e Hausamann, who in turn supplied Roessler with information that the Swiss wanted to pass to the Soviets.

=== Resistance ===
After the assassination attempt on Hitler's life in Munich's Bürgerbräukeller on 8 November 1939, Hitler immediately identified Otto Strasser as being responsible. Strasser, a former Nazi member and opponent of Hitler, was living in Switzerland at the time with his family. In November 1939, Hausamann was ordered by Masson to inform Strasser that he must leave Switzerland. Hausamann decided in the interests of his country to refuse the order and this prevented the extradition of Otto Strasser to Germany.

==== Officers League ====
On 25 June 1940, the Federal President Marcel Pilet-Golaz, gave a speech containing numerous references to the coming of an authoritarian regime in Switzerland and to a "new order" in Europe. After the speech, officers of the Swiss militia founded the "Gotthardbund", as an instrument of unconditional resistance to the threatening danger of Nazism from Germany. The Gotthard Bund organisation eventually had more than 8000 members. However, when it was found out that many of those members had doubts about an uncompromising resistance against Nazism, the Officers League was founded. In July 1940, together with Alfred Ernst, Max Waibel and August R. Lindt, Hausamann was one of the founders of the Officers' League, whose members wanted to offer unconditional resistance to a German attack. The League was dissolved by Henri Guisan and the participants were subject to disciplinary action. After a brief period in custody, Hausamann became a co-founder of civilian successor organisations to the Officers' League: On 7 September 1940, together with the later UN Commissioner for Refugees August R. Lindt, he initiated the Swiss paramilitary organization Aktion Nationaler Widerstand (Resistant National Action) (Note: This was a secret resistance organisation during the Second World War in Switzerland. Its members fought against defeatism among the army leadership, the government and the people in order to strengthen the militia army's collective power of resistance and will to fight, so that the country could defend itself against propaganda pressure and a possible military attack by National Socialist Germany) and in January 1941 the Eidgenössische Gemeinschaft. Hausamann continuously reported to General Guisan how the head of training of the army, Colonel Corps Commander Ulrich Wille, tried from autumn 1940 to have him replaced with the help of the envoy of the German Reich, Otto Köcher. Hausamann and the Aktion Nationaler Widerstand distrusted the head of the Federal Political Department, Marcel Pilet-Golaz, because he had received National Socialists and was pursuing a foreign policy of undignified conformity. They thwarted Pilet-Golaz's contacts with the German Reich. In return, Pilet-Golaz unsuccessfully demanded that General Guisan remove Hausamann from the intelligence service.

== After World War II ==
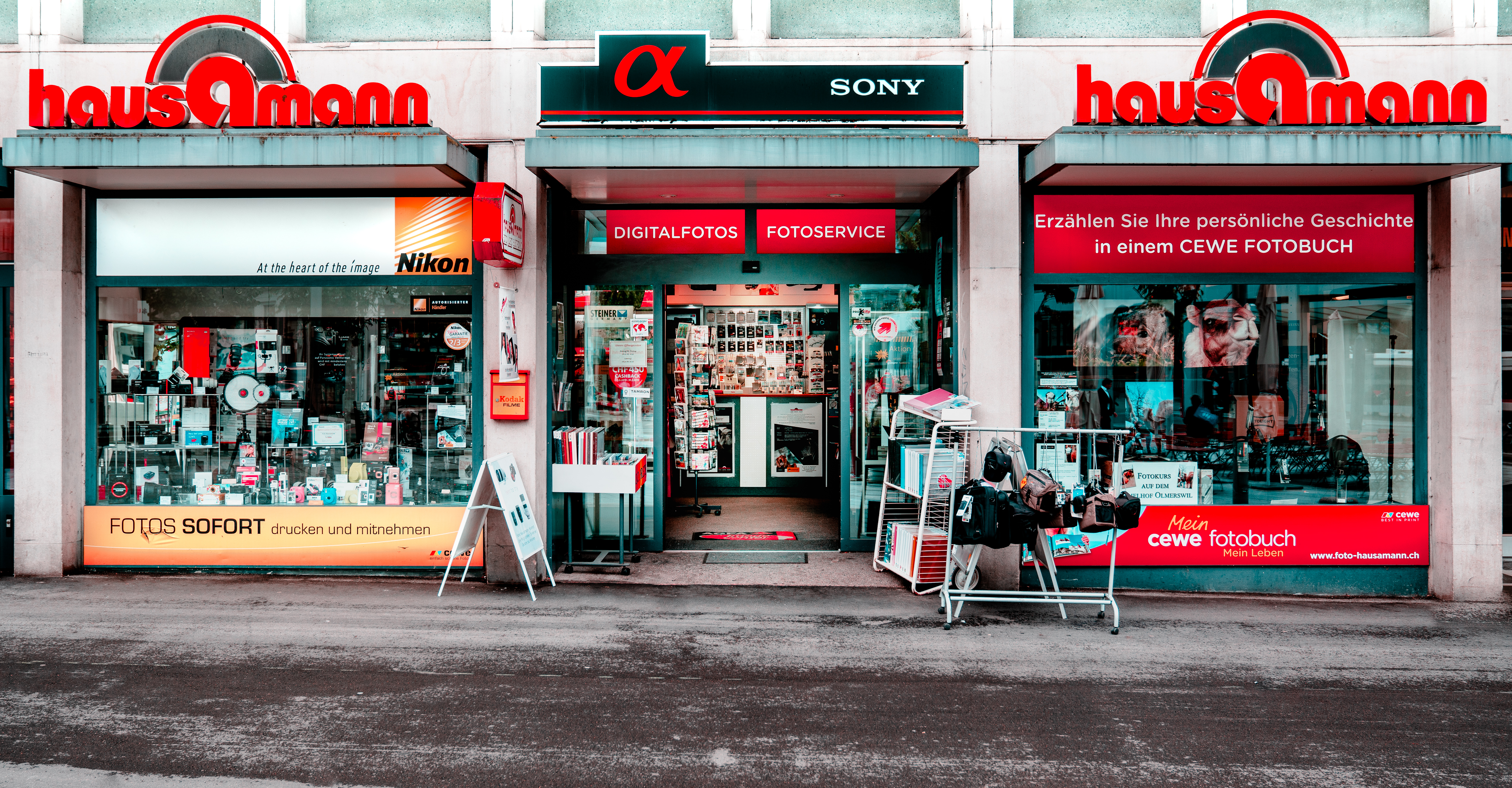
The photo shop Hausamann Kreutzer GmbH, which has still existed at Bahnhofplatz 1 since its foundation in 1925

In autumn 1945 Hausamann worked for the Swiss army as a liaison to the French troops in Vorarlberg. After the dissolution of the Ha office in 1946, he again became involved in the management of his company. At the University of St. Gallen he lectured on military history of the Second World War. He was also a member of the St. Gallen Masonic Lodge "Concordia".

During much of his life, Hausamann was a keen horse rider. In 1953, he established a small horse riding tournament, International Equestrian Sports Days. A year later the tournament became part of tournament sequences with Munich, Ulm, Tübingen, Bregenz or Salzburg. In 1957, he expanded the tournament again to include a horse show jumping competition that was affiliated with the Concours de Saut International. He created the tournament in a rural area of Breitfeld in St. Gallen, that took advantage of the area known for its textile industry. At the tournaments were fashion shows, a float parade, demonstration of vaulting groups and a dressage program given by Ernst Lindenbauer. Hausamann ran the tournament for 15 years after the war.

== Awards ==
In 1973, the year before his death, he was awarded an honorary doctorate in political science from the University of St. Gallen. After he died in Orselina, his archives were given to the Swiss Federal Archives.
