= Intelligence Service Act (Switzerland) =

Law overseeing the Swiss intelligence agency

Intelligence Service Act (IntelSA)

Federal Assembly of Switzerland
- Long title: Federal Act on the Intelligence Service (SR 121)
- Territorial extent: Switzerland
- Enacted by: Federal Assembly of Switzerland
- Enacted: 25 September 2015
- Commenced: 1 September 2017

Repeals
- Federal Act on Civilian Intelligence (2008)
- Status: Current legislation

The Intelligence Service Act (IntelSA) (Note: German: Nachrichtendienstgesetz, NDG; French: Loi fédérale sur le renseignement, LRens; Italian: Legge federale sulle attività informative, LAIn) is a Swiss federal law that defines the powers and scope of the Federal Intelligence Service (FIS), the country's intelligence agency. It was adopted on 25 September 2015 by the Federal Assembly and came into force on 1 September 2017. It replaces the Federal Act on Civilian Intelligence from 2008.

== History ==
In 2009, the Federal Council ordered the implementation of the IntelSa project. In March 2013, the Federal Council launched a consultation on this project, which was confirmed in its broad outlines during the procedure. On February 19, 2014, the Federal Council approved the draft law and the message to the Parliament. On September 25, 2015, the National Council approved the law by 145 votes to 41 with 8 abstentions and the Council of States by 35 votes to 5 and 3 abstentions.

The law was challenged in a referendum but was approved by the population on 25 September 2016 with 65.5% of votes.

The law came into force on 1 September 2017. It replaces the Federal Act on Civilian Intelligence (Note: German: Bundesgesetz über die Zuständigkeiten im Bereichdes zivilen Nachrichtendienstes, ZNDG; French: Loi fédérale sur le renseignement civil, LFRC; Italian: Legge federale sul servizio informazioni civile, LSIC) from 2008.

== Key provisions ==
One of the most significant changes introduced by IntelSA is the expanded surveillance powers granted to the intelligence services. According to the law, the intelligence services can monitor phone calls, emails, and other forms of communication without a warrant, provided that they are targeting individuals or groups suspected of posing a threat to national security. The law also includes safeguards to ensure that surveillance is necessary, proportionate, and subject to oversight by an independent supervisory authority.

IntelSA emphasizes that intelligence services must operate within the framework of Swiss law and respect fundamental rights, including privacy and freedom of expression. Any intelligence gathering activities that violate these principles are strictly prohibited, and individuals or groups affected by such activities have the right to seek legal redress.

Additionally, IntelSA establishes a new system of parliamentary oversight for the intelligence services. A special committee is responsible for monitoring their activities and ensuring compliance with the law. This is a significant improvement over the previous system, which lacked transparency and accountability.

IntelSA also promotes international cooperation and information sharing between the Swiss intelligence services and their foreign counterparts. This is important for addressing transnational threats, such as terrorism and cybercrime, which often require a coordinated response from multiple countries.

== See also ==
- Swiss intelligence agencies
