= Alfred Ernst =

Swiss botanist (1875–1968)

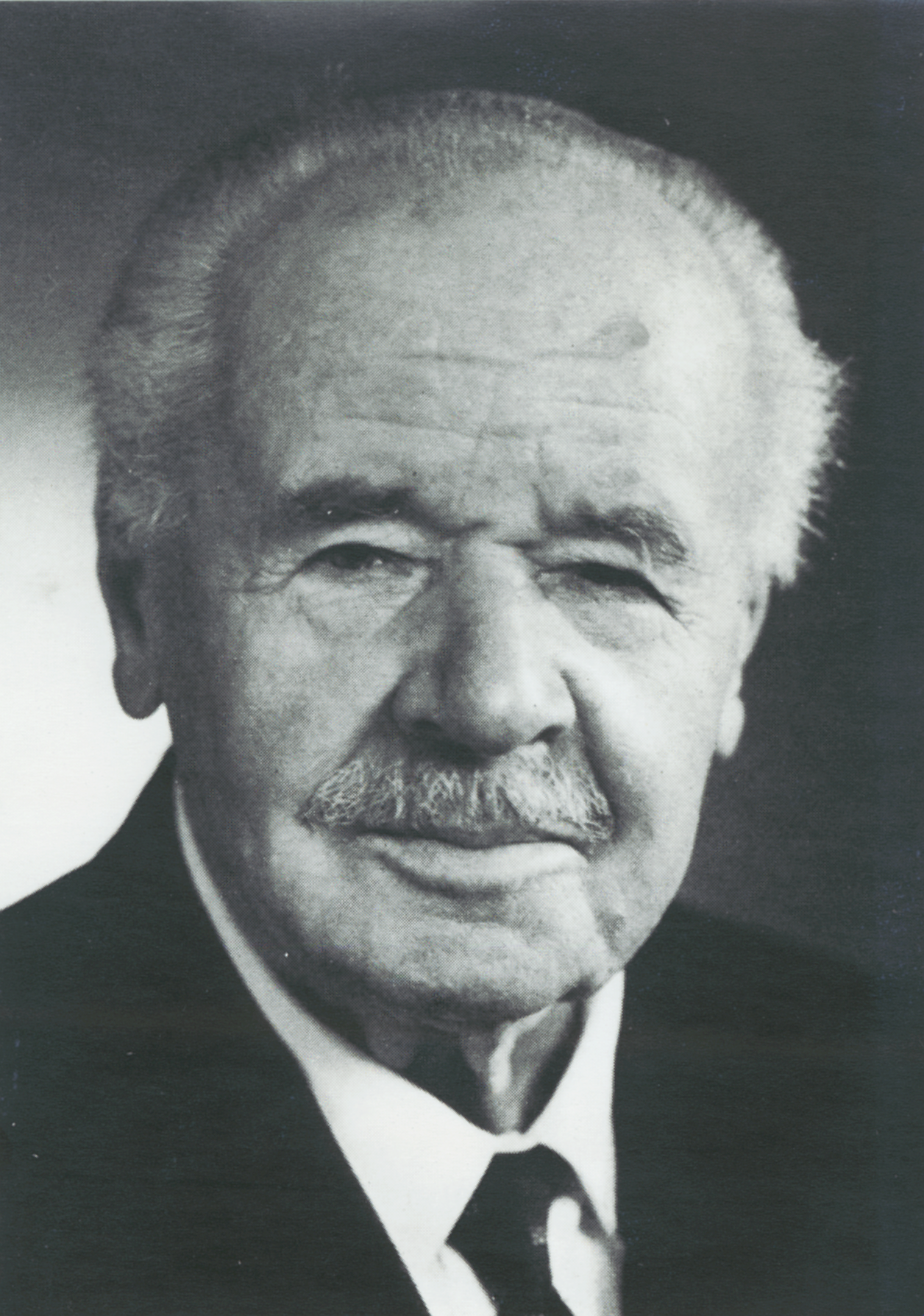
Alfred Ernst, c. 1935

Alfred Ernst (21 February 1875, Winterthur – 17 September 1968, Zürich) was a Swiss botanist.

He attended classes at the teachers' seminar in Küsnacht, followed by studies of biological sciences in Paris. From 1897 to 1899 he worked as a teacher in Naples. Afterwards, he received his doctorate in sciences from the University of Zürich, where in 1905, he became an associate professor. From 1909 to 1945 he was a professor of general botany at Zürich, being chosen university rector in 1928.

His primary research dealt with the propagation of algae, the embryology of flowering plants and heterostyly in Primula species. In 1905/06 and 1930/31 he was involved in botanical investigations in Java.

== Selected works ==
- Bastardierung als Ursache der Apogamie im Pflanzenreich, 1918 – Hybridization as the cause of apogamy in the plant kingdom.
- Ernst, A. (1922), "Artkreuzungen in der Gattung Primula (Species crosses in the genus Primula)", Zeitschrift für induktive Abstammungs- und Vererbungslehre, 27: 233–235
- Ernst, A. (1922), "Chromosomenzahl und Rassenbildung (Chromosome numbers and race formation)", Vierteljahrsschrift der Naturforschenden Gesellschaft in Zürich, 67: 75–108
- Genetische Studien über Heterostylie bei Primula, 1925 – Genetic studies of heterostyly in Primula.
- Weitere Studien über die Vererbung der Calcycanthemie bei Primula, 1931 – Further studies on inheritance of calycanthema with Primula.
- Die Nachkommenschaften aus Kreuzungen zwischen dimorphen und monomorphen Primula-Arten der Sektion Candelabra, 1943 – The progeny from crosses between dimorphic and monomorphic Primula species of the section Candelabra.
