= Jakob Labhart =

Swiss army officer (1881–1949)

- Born: 28 January 1881; Steckborn, Switzerland
- Died: 6 August 1949 (aged 68); Sigriswil, Switzerland
- Military career
- Allegiance: Switzerland
- Branch: Swiss Army
- Rank: Corps commander
- Commands: Chief of the General Staff (1936–1939); Chief of the Army Staff (1939–1940); 4th Army Corps (1940–1947)

Jakob Labhart (28 January 1881 – 6 August 1949), also spelled Jakob Labhardt, was a Swiss army officer who served as chief of the general staff from 1936 and as chief of the army staff at the outbreak of the Second World War, before commanding the 4th Army Corps from 1940 to 1947.

== Biography ==
Labhart was born on 28 January 1881 in Steckborn, the son of Jacob Hermann Labhart, a physician and farmer, and Lisette Bauer. In 1907 he married Gertrud Eggemann, daughter of the dentist Konrad Eggemann; the marriage was dissolved in 1932, and he later married Anna Maria Wecker. He studied at the polytechnic schools of Charlottenburg and Munich.

Labhart served as an artillery instruction officer from 1905 to 1916, including training with the Prussian field artillery regiment at Altona in 1907–1908, and became a general staff officer in 1916. From 1916 to 1921 he headed the wages office at the shoe manufacturer Bally, and from 1921 to 1924 he was deputy director of the Federal Labour Office. He commanded an artillery regiment (1923–1924), was promoted to colonel in 1930, commanded the 4th artillery brigade (1930–1931), served as chief of staff of the 2nd Army Corps (1932), and commanded the 13th infantry brigade (1932–1934).

As head of the transport section of the general staff from 1925 to 1934, Labhart oversaw the railway, staging, and motor vehicle services, and was responsible for the motorization carried out under the 1924 troop organization. As a divisional commander and head of the cavalry arm (1935–1936), he prepared the merger of the mobile formations—dragoons, cyclists, and motorized troops—into a single arm known as the "light troops." In May 1936 he became deputy chief of the general staff, and in August chief of the general staff and a corps commander, with the divisional commander Jakob Huber as his deputy.

In 1939 Labhart was appointed chief of the army staff (the designation of the general staff in active service), in which capacity he drew up the neutrality deployment adopted by the army that September. The decision of General Henri Guisan to give priority to defending against a German invasion created tensions between the commander-in-chief and Labhart, who was not informed of the Franco-Swiss staff talks conducted by representatives of the commander-in-chief. At the beginning of January 1940, Guisan appointed him commander of the new 4th Army Corps—a post he held until 1947—and named Huber to succeed him at the army staff, although Labhart officially retained his function as chief of the general staff.
