= Büro Ha =

Büro Ha also known as Buero Ha was a Swiss intelligence agency that was founded by Major Hans Hausamann in September 1939 and established by the Swiss Militia. It was closed in 1949.

== History ==
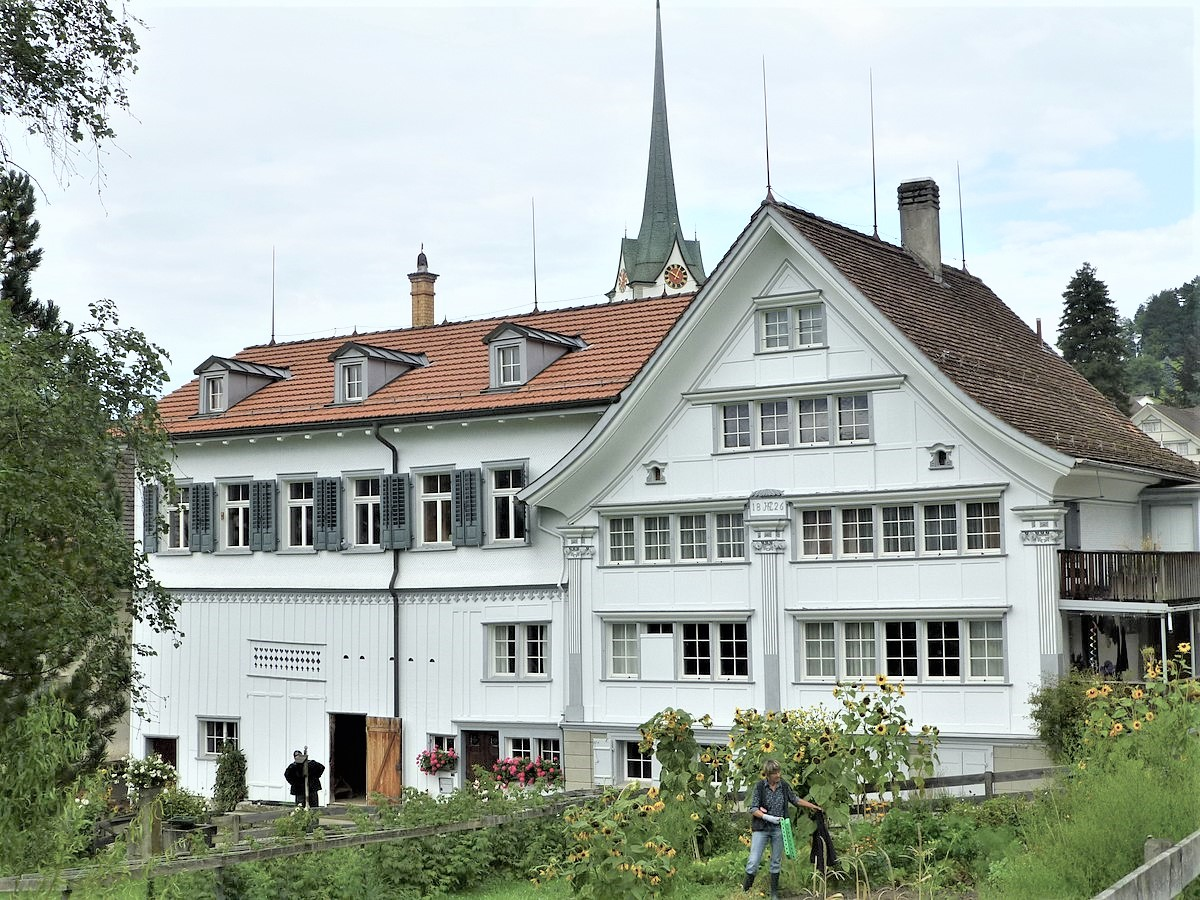
The office of Ha in Teufen, Hechtstrasse

Büro Ha was founded in September 1939. with an office that was set up in Teufen by the Swiss Militia. The agency was a covert arm of Swiss Intelligence, disguised as a press-cuttings agency. The agency was designed to develop the Swiss defence force and at the same time enable the Swiss to maintain the dubious claim of neutrality. Buero Ha was established as an independent agency by Hausamann because he feared, during the period that led up to the war and in the event of a war, that the official intelligence agency, the Swiss Army Intelligence would be too small to defend Switzerland.

In 1939–1940, Hausamann's office was moved to the Villa Stutz in Horw-St. Niklausen south of Lucerne. Against the resistance of the intelligence section of the army staff, Hausamann later succeeded in finding accommodation in the Hotel Schweizerhof in Lucerne, where Intelligence Collection Point 1, headed by Max Waibel, was already located. The radio equipment remained in Teufen, and a telex connection was added. Hausamann's office consisted of Hausamann himself, two women from the Women's Auxiliary Service, a radio operator and an office orderly who was also a driver.

Haussaman was assisted in the agency by military intelligence officer, Czech colonel Karel Sedlacek, who was with the Czech government-in-exile in Switzerland. Hausamann reported to the 5th Section of the Army Staff. Brigadier Roger Masson. of the Swiss General Staff, was chief of Swiss wartime intelligence.

== Organisation ==
Büro Ha's offices in the Teufen villa HQ were organised into four departments. Buero D focused on Germany, while Buero F focused on France and Buero I was Italy. Hausamann's office had two secretaries and Czech colonel Karel Sedlacek as an assistant.

== Operations and reports ==
=== Future world view on Soviet Union ===
In a travel report from Austria on 1 June 1938, it is stated:

"Germany's plans are directed towards the East. Germany can only gain living space in the East if it is not prevented from doing so from the West. The German military leaders are aware that they can only achieve the goals set by the politicians if the entire force to be provided by the German people is available for use in the East. If Germany had to withdraw individual army corps to cover the Rhine front, then, given the present state of equipment, success in Eastern politics would be called into question. Germany therefore has an eminent interest in Switzerland becoming as militarily strong as possible. As long as Germany pursues her plans for the East, we have nothing to fear from Germany, but from France."

=== Memorandum of 1 June 1940: On the situation after the collapse of France ===
The situation of Switzerland in June 1940

After the collapse of France, states that had remained democratic or the constitutional Principality of Liechtenstein were endangered. According to Germany, Germany should organize the European continent. In a large-scale system, the leading people grant the people being led graduated autonomy. But for the peoples being led there would be no sovereignty, no independence and no territorial integrity.

From the Swiss point of view, the question therefore arose as to how the war would develop in the future and how Switzerland could retain its sovereignty. In the memorandum of 1 June 1940, the Hausamann office describes and assesses the political and military situation in detail:

"Without a fight, Britain will be lost. If it loses its overseas possessions, it will no longer be viable and will no longer be able to feed the island's resident population. Britain and France no longer have a base of operations on the Continent. Germany can now turn its attention to acquiring and securing living space in the East. The German-Russian friendship will therefore fall apart, perhaps rapidly. The USA has already become so financially involved on the side of the Western powers that it cannot accept a British defeat. A US entry into the war can be expected soon. Since Britain must fight, it will

- Mobilise half the world against the Axis powers
- Increase its naval and air power
- Blockade the Axis powers from world traffic as far as possible
- Support Russia in the event of war against Germany
- Defeat Germany altogether as a result of its miscalculation after a long war.

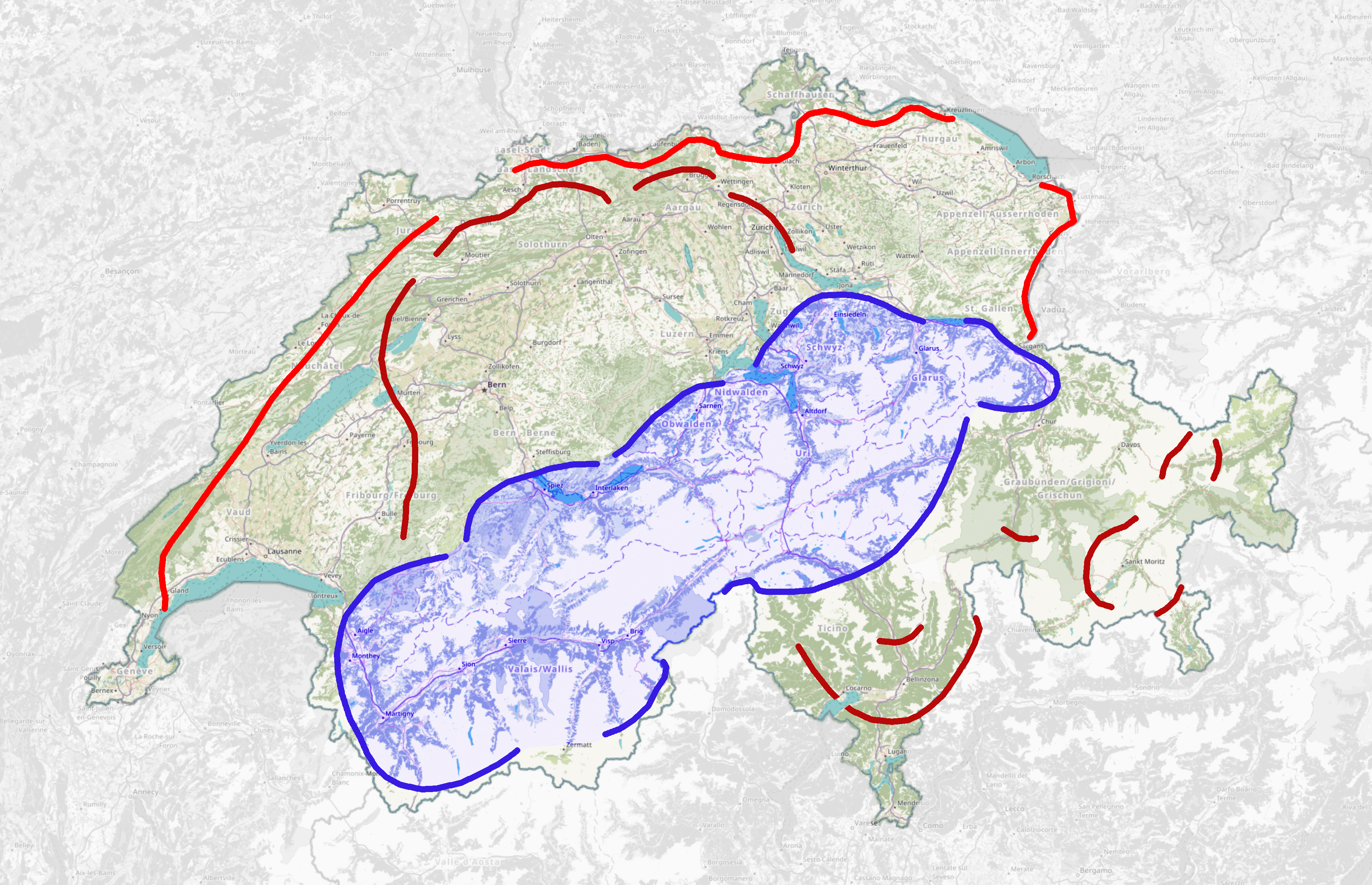
The Swiss National Redoubt defensive plan. When the war started it was updated

It is to be expected that in the course of the next few years Germany will demand concessions from Switzerland, the fulfilment of which will be tantamount to the surrender of the inalienable rights of freedom. Switzerland can successfully refuse to comply if it takes precautions to ensure that, in the event of military force being used, it can immediately destroy all reserves, economic goods and installations in which the enemy might have an interest.

In addition, it would have to organise a defence of Central Switzerland calculated for the long term. The defence area could include the Sargans, Grisons mountains, Gotthard - Central Switzerland and Bernese and Valais Alps. However, it is no longer possible to ensure national defence on the fortified line of Lake Zurich, Limmat, Hauenstein and Blauen on the cantonal border of Solothurn/Basel-Landschaft because German armies have advanced to the western side of the Jura."

The prognosis for the war's outcome was accurate, but inevitable success was not associated with the war effort. The convoys across the Atlantic, vital to Britain, could hardly defend themselves against German submarine attacks until 1942. It was only with the invention of radar and the orchestrated use of air surveillance, radio reconnaissance and radar that convoys could be effectively protected from 1942 onwards. The defence of the Soviet Union was on the brink of failure in 1941 and 1942. In June 1941, parts of the Wehrmacht leadership already assumed that the blitzkrieg against the Soviet Union would be successful. It was not until 5 December 1941 that the attack became bogged down thirty kilometres from Moscow during the Battle of Moscow. Hitler's second campaign was also difficult for the Soviet Union to stop. Only by narrow margins and with endless sacrifices was the Soviet Union able to stop the more northerly German advance at Stalingrad and the more southerly one at Novorossiysk.

=== On the Intended Victory Order after the First Campaign against the Soviet Union in 1941 ===
The draft of Directive No. 32 of 11 June 1941, "Victory Order", assumes that the Soviet Russian Forces has been crushed and that Germany and Italy dominate the European mainland, for the time being with the exception of Spain and Portugal, and that the newly won eastern region must be organised and secured. Hausamann's office reported on this on 1 July 1941:

"In the Reich capital, Berlin, the view was expressed that, contrary to widespread opinion, the Soviet Russian Wehrmacht had not been crushed, but could pass over into a war of position. This, however, would be precisely the development that the Germans wanted to prevent at all costs. The Russian warfare was surprising. Resistance of such tenacity was not expected. In the opinion of high German Wehrmacht leaders, it must be decided in the next few days whether the German army command can keep the operations that have been started flowing."

The hint was useful and accurate, for on 5 December 1941, contrary to expectations of victory, the first Russian campaign was to bog down outside Moscow and the Soviet counter-attack was to take place.

=== On German invasion intentions and plans ===
On 18 March 1940 the agency reported:

"German spy offices are being moved from the Netherlands to Switzerland. The news is reassuring, for one does not set up espionage offices in an area which one intends to attack quickly afterwards."

At the same time, however, the Army High Command had an operational plan drawn up for the raid-like occupation of Switzerland. The third version was completed on 12 August 1940.

On 25 July 1940, "Tannenbaum" reported on the attack plan:

"In the opinion of the Office for Foreign German Affairs of the Nazis, with headquarters in Stuttgart, there is no hurry to invade Switzerland. The plans for the occupation have been fully worked out, but there is no order from Hitler for the invasion."

On 31 July 1940, a line of division was agreed between Germany and Italy in the event of the occupation of Switzerland. On 26 August 1940, the Chief of the Army General Staff, Franz Halder, ordered Army Group C to draw up an operational plan once again, again taking into account an Italian area of interest. At the end of October 1940, Hausammann's office reported from the NSDAP Office of Foreign Affairs, based in Stuttgart:

"Military action against Switzerland is not planned. Instead, Switzerland is to be forced to agree to the reorganisation of the European continent in due course. In doing so, Switzerland will be required to break off diplomatic relations with Great Britain. With this gesture, Switzerland can show that it is willing to fit into the new Europe without reservation. From the German point of view, this should be done by the end of 1940. If Switzerland does not comply with the German request, force will be used. In this case, it is planned that German-speaking Switzerland will be annexed to the Gau Oberrhein. All preparations for the political and administrative annexation of Switzerland are ready, worked out in detail and can be put into effect immediately. The corresponding documents are in Stuttgart and are being kept up to date by officials designated for this purpose."

For three months there was hardly any talk of Switzerland in Germany. Since the beginning of February 1941, according to the Hausamann office, there was more talk of Switzerland again, in connection with talks about the reorganisation of the European continent:

"On the part of Germany, one cannot tolerate a small state stepping out of line in the middle of the continent, after all the other states of the continent have taken into account the military and defence-economic needs of the Axis powers, Germany and Italy. As small as Switzerland is, it nevertheless represents a danger. It offers shelter to all forces that want to thwart the plans of the Axis powers, Germany and Italy. In Switzerland, a conception of the state is cultivated which is diametrically opposed to the conceptions cultivated in the totalitarian states. The domination of Switzerland, however, is absolutely necessary with a view to the further possible development of the war effort."

On 20 May 1941, Hausamann's office reported that Germany intended to partition Switzerland along the following lines:

"Central Switzerland is to remain as an evolved unit. Since it will not be viable on its own, its integration into the Greater German economic area will be self-evident. All other parts of Switzerland, which only joined the Swiss Confederation in the course of the centuries, will be separated again and assigned to France and Italy, and northern and eastern Switzerland to the German Reich. Finland and Sweden are also to be placed under German economic control."

For a year, Switzerland had peace from German plans of attack, because all forces were taken up for the invasion of the Soviet Union. In 1942, Switzerland again came more strongly into the German field of vision because an invasion of Western Europe, France or Spain, was expected. At the end of September 1942, the Hausamann office reported on this:

"In the event of an invasion, Switzerland must thoroughly cease to cultivate its diplomatic, commercial and social relations with the Anglo-Saxons, who profit most from this. Over and above political and economic concessions, Switzerland will be required to make in detail

- The right to use all Swiss railways and roads for Axis transports to Italy and France,
- The right of the Axis powers to protect these transports with their own means,
- The right of the Axis Powers to station their own air and anti-aircraft units on Swiss territory; the assumption of air protection by the Axis Powers; the subordination of Swiss air and anti-aircraft units to a German high command,
- The unconditional incorporation of Swiss industry into the war production of the Axis powers and its subordination to the German military economic command,
- The transfer of economic goods stored in Switzerland, insofar as they represent a reinforcement of the war potential of the Axis Powers,
- The introduction of postal and telegram censorship, exercised by Swiss censors under German supervision."

=== Memorandum on Soviet Defence against the Caucasus Campaign 1942 ===
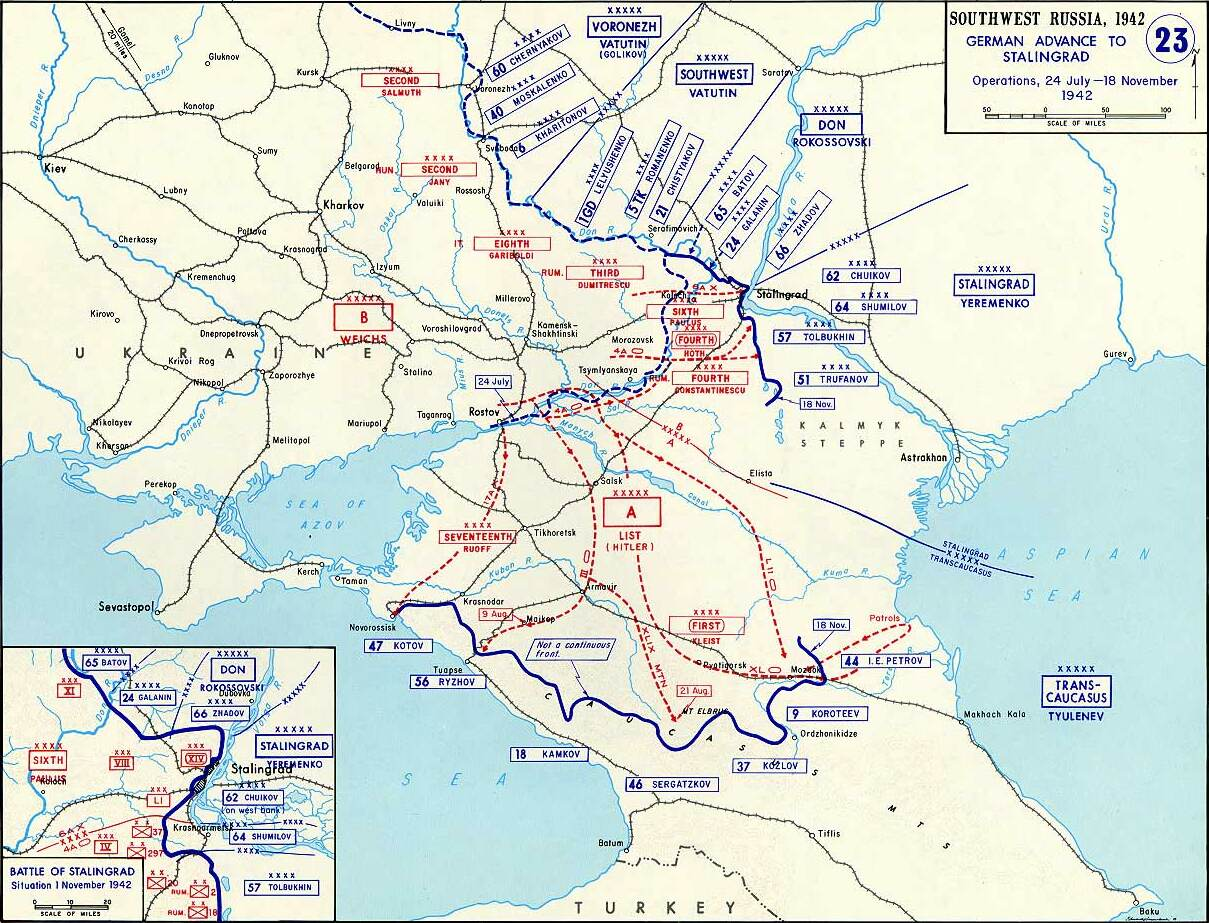
The Caucasus campaign in 1942

On 16 August 1942, Hausamann's office took a position on Hitler's second Russian campaign in 1942. On 9 August, the fast units of Army Group A reached the oil fields of Maikop northwest of the Caucasus. The Soviet troops retreated quickly, but not precipitously and not in thick columns, and did not move to counterattacks in the mountains until 12 September 1942. This raised the question in the Army Intelligence and Security Service as to whether the Red Army was still at all capable of fighting in the southern part of the theatre of war, or whether it was an elastic defence. In Germany, this led to a largely orderly retreat.

In Germany, the largely orderly withdrawal led to political considerations: Ernst von Weizsäcker, State Secretary in the Foreign Office, speculated on 9 August 1942 that the Soviet Union would leave it to Great Britain to defend its access to Iraq, Iran and India. Similarly, the Defence Department of the Foreign Armies East of the Supreme Command of the Wehrmacht stated on 9 September 1942 that it had learned from Comintern circles that the Red Army would only participate to a small extent in the defence of the Caucasus, leaving the main share to Great Britain, which was interested in this. The Soviet Union was not interested in the defence of the Caucasus.

Hausamann's office took up these views and in its memorandum of 16 August 1942 for Brigadier Colonel Roger Masson, the head of the Swiss Army's intelligence and security service, insinuated that the Red Army had a war policy intention:

"While the German armies are advancing towards the Caucasus, Tymoshenko is leaving the majority of his troops virtually standing guard for the Germans. They try in vain to bring Timoshenko's army to the final battle. From the point of view of war policy and strategy, the Soviet Union is by no means in a tight spot. Moscow's strategy is to finally drive the Anglo-Saxon armies into battle by opening the Caucasus to the Germans and with it the gateway into Iran and Iraq, to the main Anglo-Saxon positions on the route to India, where the Germans could reach out to the Japanese. If the Anglo-Saxons do not soon give up trying to make the Red Army bleed for them, we shall see the Soviet Union give way to the Axis powers and wait quietly along its bloody border until the time comes for them to act. The German army command is faced with the most difficult decisions. If it stops its columns of march north of the Caucasus,

- It will miss the opportunity to reach out to the Japanese in the Persian Gulf,
- Britain retains her world empire and remains an irreconcilable foe with all the warlike consequences for Germany,
- Germany has an unbroken enemy in the Soviet Union,
- Germany gains only the oil fields of Maikop and Grozny, but these are within range of Soviet bombers,
- Germany can only cultivate the territories conquered in the East as far as they are not in the catchment area of partisans.

For the German Reich leadership, the situation is hopeless. It has no choice but to conquer itself to death."

Recent research, on the other hand, denies that there was any strategic or war policy intention behind the Red Army's retreat. They conclude this from the fact that Stalin forbade retreats only two months after the elastic defence began. On 28 July 1942, Stalin issued Order No. 227, a directive that all retreats must cease and every position and every metre of Soviet soil must be defended. From December 1942, the Red Army began its winter offensive against Army Group A from the Caucasus.

== Closure ==
In 1949, Büro Ha was closed. Hausamann's reports have been preserved in their entirety and are stored and available for consultation in chronological order in the Swiss Federal Archives. Copies are available at the Institute of Contemporary History in Munich.
