= Swiss intelligence agencies =

Collective term for Swiss federal intelligence and security agencies

Federal Intelligence Service
- (in German) Nachrichtendienst des Bundes (in French) Service de renseignement de la Confédération (in Italian) Servizio delle attività informative della Confederazione (in Romansh) Servetsch d'infurmaziun da la Confederaziun

Agency overview
- Jurisdiction: Federal administration of Switzerland
- Employees: 438
- Minister responsible: Martin Pfister, Federal Councillor
- Parent agency: Federal Department of Defence, Civil Protection and Sports
- Website: www.fis.admin.ch

The Swiss intelligence community is a group of agencies with responsibilities to protect the interests and infrastructure of Switzerland.

The Federal Intelligence Service (FIS), the country's main intelligence agency, is governed by the Intelligence Service Act.

== History ==
The first federal military secret service was established in 1937-1939 as Büro Ha by Hans Hausamann a few years before the outbreak of the Second World War. Up to that point, the responsibility for intelligence gathering was left to the police.

=== Cold War Intelligence ===
Not much is known about the Swiss intelligence agencies; however, case files from the Swiss Federal Police have been recently uncovered showing information regarding Swiss intelligence dealing with the People's Republic of China. During this time period of approximately 1960-1980 Switzerland's main goal regarding intelligence was the threat of communism within the country. What was found in the case files, and one way they would combat communism is through the system of fiches. Fiches was a system of index cards that tracked any sort of anti-patriotic actions performed by anyone in Switzerland. The system seemed to be successful with a recorded 900,000 cards made during the Cold War, and about 25,000 cards made for people of Chinese, Korean, and Vietnamese descent. The ultimate goal of fiches was to ward off any potential communist threats that might cause harm to Switzerland.

== Federal Intelligence Service ==
As of 1 January 2010, there is a new security policy instrument in Switzerland, the Federal Intelligence Service (FIS) (German: Nachrichtendienst des Bundes, NDB; French: Service de renseignement de la Confédération, SRC; Italian: Servizio delle attività informative della Confederazione, SIC; Romansh: Servetsch da las activitads infurmativs da la Confederaziun, SIC). The new service was created by merging the Service for Analysis and Prevention (DAP) with the Strategic Intelligence Service (SND). Through the use of synergies and consistent adjustment to the needs of the service recipients, an intelligence service was created which is adapted to meet modern requirements and forms the future contact for all levels of the Swiss Confederation and the cantons.

=== Partners and service recipients ===
The partners and service recipients of the FIS are the political and military leaders, the federal administration, in particular the departments:

- Federal Department of Defence, Civil Protection and Sport (DDPS)
- Federal Department of Justice and Police (FDJP)
- Federal Department of Foreign Affairs (FDFA)
- Federal Department of Economic Affairs (FDEA).
- Important partners are also the cantons, including 84 national security agents engaged by the Confederation.

Abroad the FIS maintains contacts to more than 100 intelligence, police and security services throughout the world. These bilateral and multilateral contacts have all been authorised by the Federal Council.

=== Organization ===
The FIS's activities and mandate were defined by statute in the Federal Civil Intelligence Act 1997

- the FIS procures security policy relevant information about other countries and evaluates these
- the FIS fulfils intelligence tasks relating to domestic security according to the STA
- the FIS ensures a comprehensive assessment of the threat situation.

And according to the Federal Civil Intelligence Act

- the FIS recognises and combats dangers relating to terrorism, illegal intelligence, violent extremism and proliferation and
- identifies attacks against critical information infrastructure.

The thematic and geographic areas of interest are:

- In Switzerland these are terrorism and violent extremism, proliferation, attacks against critical infrastructure and illegal intelligence activities.
- Abroad, the FIS's thematic areas continue to be proliferation, terrorism, armed forces development, operational areas of our armed forces abroad as well as weapon technology and arms trade.
- The geographic areas of interest continue to be Europe, Russia and the CIS states, the Near East and north Africa, the Middle East, Asia, the US and hot spots in Africa.

=== Publications ===
The Federal Intelligence Service produces an annual report called Switzerland's Security, available for download on the FIS website.

For instance, in September 2020, about the China–Switzerland relations, the report said that:

The gap between the Western liberal model and China's authoritarian state capitalism will widen further. Reports on the regime's propaganda, disinformation campaigns, censorship and severe repression of its opponents in Hong Kong and ethnic minorities in Tibet and Xinjiang mark the growing international perception of the threat posed by China.

=== Budget ===
In 2017, the FIS' budget was CHF75.6 million.

== Other Swiss intelligence agencies ==
=== Military Intelligence Service ===
The Military Intelligence Service (German: Militärischer Nachrichtendienst; French: Service de renseignement militaire; Italian: Servizio informazioni militare) is the military intelligence branch of the Armed Forces.

=== Postal Service and Telecommunications Surveillance ===
The Postal Service and Telecommunications Surveillance (French: Surveillance de la correspondance par poste et télécommunication, SCPT; German: Überwachung Post- und Fernmeldeverkehr, ÜPF; Italian: Sorveglianza della corrispondenza postale e del traffico delle telecomunicazioni, SCPT; Romansh: surveglianza dal traffic da posta e da telecommunicaziun, STPT) is a service within the Federal Department of Justice and Police (since 1 January 2008) charged with coordinating wiretapping requests of the criminal investigation authorities.

== International cooperation ==
FIS has collaborated with over 100 foreign intelligence agencies. In 2017, the FIS received approximately 12,500 notifications from foreign intelligence agencies, and sent out 6,000.

== Controversies ==
In 2012, a senior IT technician stole crucial intelligence documents.

In 2014, an agent of the Federal Intelligence Services was involved in a hacking case against journalists acting for Dominique Giroud, a Swiss winemaker.

The Swiss intelligence agency has been accused of transmitting sensitive information to Russia between 2015 and 2020.

According to a 2020-Swiss parliamentary investigation, "Swiss intelligence service were aware of and benefited from the Zug-based firm Crypto AG’ s involvement in the US-led spying", questioning Swiss neutrality.

In 2025, the E.U. sanctioned Swiss citizen and ex-intelligence Officer Jacques Baud for "acting as a mouthpiece for pro-Russian propaganda and making conspiracy theories".

== See also ==
- Onyx (interception system)
- Secret files scandal
- Intelligence Service Act
