= Maximator (intelligence alliance) =

Danish-French-German-Dutch-Swedish alliance

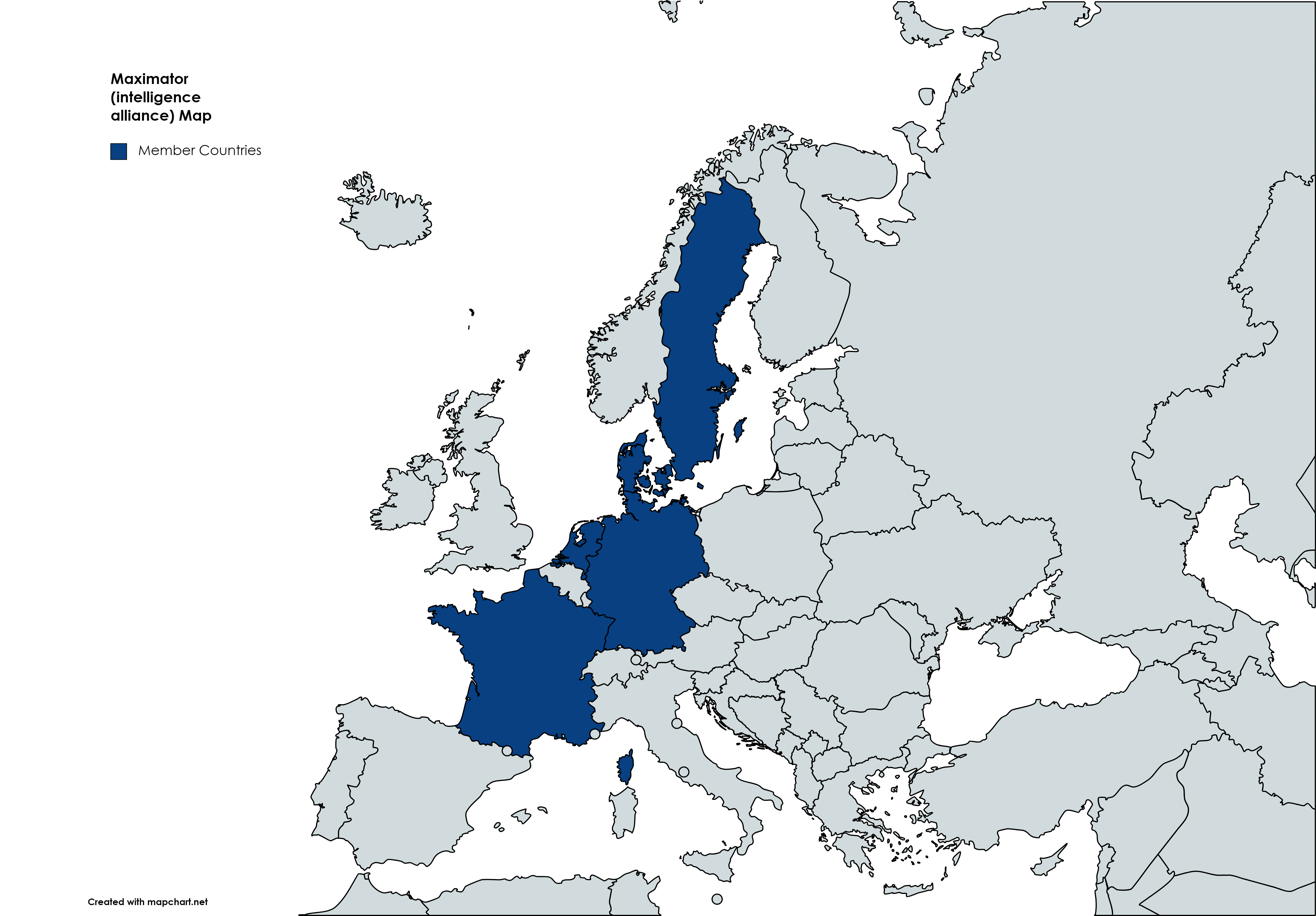
- Members shown in blue
- Type: Intelligence alliance
- Members: Denmark; France; Germany; Netherlands; Sweden
- Establishment: 1976; 50 years ago

Maximator (named after a type of beer from the German brewery Augustiner-Bräu) is an alliance between the secret services of Denmark, France, Germany, the Netherlands, and Sweden, comparable to the Five Eyes. It was founded in 1976 on the initiative of the Danish secret service and has operated largely undetected since then.

Relatively little is known about their work and the existence of Maximator only became public knowledge in 2020. Only certain details from the Dutch arm and associated groups have been published, but one of their most important tools for reconnaissance and decryption was the sale of encryption devices that had been compromised (backdoored). From the 1970s to the 2010s, one method involved Crypto AG, a supposedly private Swiss company secretly owned by the German BND and the American CIA.

== History ==
The motives for the alliance were twofold: cooperation on signals intelligence via satellites and cooperation on technical interception challenges and exchange methods.

The alliance was founded in 1976 by Danish intelligence and initially only consisted of Denmark, Sweden and West Germany. The Dutch government was invited to join in 1977 and joined in 1978. The name was chosen in 1979 and was taken from a Munich-brewed beer. France requested to join in 1983 and with strong support from West Germany joined in 1984.

Other countries have asked to join, but these requests have been turned down. Professor Bart Jacobs claims that these include Norway, Spain and Italy.

== Activities ==
So far, only some activities by the Dutch arm, Technisch Informatie Verwerkingscentrum (TIVC), are publicly known, mostly providing administrative assistance to the GCHQ, a British organization, during the Falklands War in decoding of Argentine radio traffic.

At the urging of the CIA, the sale of compromised encryption devices from the Dutch company Philips to Turkey was enforced against the will of the Bundesnachrichtendienst (BND), Germany's foreign intelligence agency, and the TIVC.

The service maintained a ground station in the Caribbean on Curaçao, which monitored and decoded the radio traffic from Cuba and Venezuela.
