= Russian espionage in Germany =

Intelligence activities since WWII

During the Cold War, divided Germany had been a center of activity for the Soviet intelligence service, the KGB. It worked closely with the Ministry of State Security of the GDR and had a huge center in Berlin-Karlshorst, which controlled and coordinated KGB activities throughout Europe. After German reunification, networks of the Foreign Intelligence Service remained active in Germany. Russian espionage in Germany has increased again since the beginning of the deterioration in relations between the NATO states and the Russian Federation after the beginning of the Russian-Ukrainian war in 2014, and more and more cases of Russian espionage have become publicly known. Following the Russian war of aggression against Ukraine in 2022, espionage activities in the West are said to have reached or even exceeded Cold War levels. According to the Federal Office for the Protection of the Constitution, the methods used by Russian services in Germany include cyberattacks, sabotage, disinformation campaigns, covert influence operations and secret operations. The main targets of Russian espionage include digital, military and other critical infrastructure, as well as politics, business, society and science.

== History ==
=== World War II ===
With the German attack on the Soviet Union in June 1941, the Soviet Union and Nazi Germany became war enemies. Probably the most important Soviet spy of World War II in Germany was Richard Sorge. However, his precise information about the German attack plans, including the correct date for Hitler's attack, was not taken seriously by Josef Stalin and was ignored. In September 1941, he passed on the information that Japan did not intend to attack the Soviet Union despite the Three Power Pact with the Nazis, which allowed the Soviets to concentrate their forces on the West. Under his cover identity as a German journalist in Japan, he was soon exposed by the Japanese security services and executed in November 1944.

The resistance fighters of the Red Orchestra were considered by the Gestapo to be controlled by the Soviet Union, but were in fact more of a loose and decentralized group. As an essential part of the Red Orchestra, the Red Three were located outside the reach of German intelligence in Switzerland and transmitted messages to the Soviet military intelligence service. Its head was Alexander Radó, a Hungarian emigrant, communist and geographer. The Red Three was founded in 1936, when Radó arrived in Geneva. By April 1942, the organization was established with Radó as group leader and also had three subgroup leaders: Rachel Dübendorfer, Georges Blun and Otto Pünter. After the arrest of Leopold Trepper by the Gestapo in 1942, Radó's group became the most effective part of the Red Orchestra's spy network. It gathered useful information in Switzerland and had some contacts in Germany. Most importantly, Radó was probably also connected to the Lucy spy ring, which had very valuable contacts within Germany and was linked to British intelligence.

=== Cold War ===
After the end of the Second World War, the Soviet NKVD under secret police chief Lavrentiy Beria carried out purges in the Soviet occupation zone on behalf of Josef Stalin. Over 154,000 people were arrested and imprisoned in 10 special camps, such as the converted Sachsenhausen concentration camp from the Nazi era. In addition to Nazi perpetrators, many innocent people were also imprisoned. Almost a third of the inmates died from the poor living conditions in the camps before the East German camp system was finally dissolved in 1950.

After the Americans' successful Manhattan Project, Stalin orders the construction of a Soviet atomic bomb. The Ore Mountains were sealed off and placed under the control of the Soviet secret service. The Soviets found uranium here in 1946 under the strictest secrecy. For the next 40 years, uranium mining at Wismut was of the utmost importance for the Soviet nuclear industry. When the deposits were discovered, numerous miners died as a result of radiation or accidents.

With the onset of the Cold War, divided Berlin became a stronghold of espionage ("capital of espionage") and numerous Soviet agents were active here. The KGB, which emerged from the NKVD, was based in a huge closed-off complex in Berlin-Karlshorst from 1953 onwards. This complex was later expanded to become the KGB's largest field office abroad. The KGB coordinated actions by Soviet agents from here, including assassination attempts in West Germany. On October 12, 1957, the Ukrainian nationalist Lev Rebet was murdered by the KGB in Munich. Stepan Bandera fell victim to a similar attack in the same city two years later.

In the 1950s, the Ministry for State Security (Stasi) was founded in the GDR, which was set up by the NKVD or KGB and significantly expanded after the East German uprising of 1953. The close subordination was loosened in 1957 when the Soviets wanted to establish East Germany (German Democratic Republic, GDR) as an independent state. However, the connection between the two services remained close. At the same time, the KGB monitored events in Berlin very closely and also spied on the GDR leadership, bypassing the Stasi, as it wanted to pre-empt any deviation from the political line set by the Soviets.

In 1961, BND employee Heinz Felfe was exposed as a KGB spy. The former SS-Obersturmführer Felfe had single-handedly uncovered the identity of at least 100 agents of the Central Intelligence Agency behind the Iron Curtain and passed their identities on to the Soviets. He was exchanged for 21 Western citizens detained in the Soviet Union in 1969. The KGB is said to have recruited dozens of former Nazis into the FRG civil service in the post-war period, partly because they often had anti-American attitudes or were susceptible to blackmail.

On October 22, 1967, thanks to the help of its agents Manfred Ramminger, Josef Linowski and Wolf-Diethard Knoppe, the KGB succeeded in stealing a combat-ready Sidewinder air-to-air missile from the Neuburg airbase. Ramminger dismantled the missile and sent it in parts to Moscow. He was arrested at the end of 1968 and sentenced to three years in prison.

Egon Bahr, Willy Brandt's advisor, met conspiratorially with two KGB agents for ten years from 1969 and established a communication channel with Moscow that facilitated the Brandt government 's rapprochement with the Eastern Bloc. The KGB had also broken into Bahr's apartment and bugged it. Willy Brandt's government later collapsed as a result of the Guillaume affair.

A new partnership agreement between the Stasi and the KGB was agreed between Erich Mielke and Yuri Andropov on December 6, 1973. The specific objectives named were: combating "ideological subversion", "uncovering and thwarting enemy plans" and uncovering the enemy's "preparations for a military attack". Both services agreed on close technical cooperation and joint "guidelines". Both sides also agreed to support each other in infiltrating agents into "important enemy targets" and in carrying out "active measures". Espionage against the West Germany and West Berlin was of particular mutual interest.

The KGB also frequently worked with so-called "honey traps", in which new agents were recruited with sexual favors. For example, a lieutenant captain in the German army named Erhard Müller was seduced by a Soviet agent and revealed military secrets. He married her and in 1978 he was lured to the GDR, where he made propaganda appearances on GDR state television.^{[1} In a similar way, the KGB tried to recruit female secretaries in Bonn ministries through male agents (Romeo trap). In the Federal Chancellery, the Soviets recruited up to four secretaries at the same time, who passed on documents to the GDR and the Soviets.

From 1985, the future Russian head of state Vladimir Putin worked as an agent of the KGB in Dresden. With the ongoing economic problems of the Eastern Bloc, the KGB became increasingly interested in Western technology and industrial espionage, with Dresden acting as a center for technology transfer between West and East. Putin's exact role as a KGB agent in Germany is unknown. The British journalist Catherine Belton linked Putin's activities to Soviet support for the West German terrorist group RAF. His activities were also rumored to be connected with the murder of Alfred Herrhausen.

A final operation by the KGB to infiltrate the GDR in its interests and maintain its influence failed with Operation Lutsch under Anatoly Novikov, which was intended to influence the GDR reform movement. The KGB finally had to withdraw with German reunification and vacate its base in Berlin-Karlshorst. According to Oleg Gordievsky, there were still between 500 and 700 KGB agents in Germany towards the end of the 1980s, who were mainly active in the Cologne/Bonn, Berlin and Hamburg areas.

=== After German reunification ===
With the collapse of the Soviet Union, the KGB was dissolved and split into various successor services in the Russian Federation, including the domestic intelligence service FSB, the military intelligence service GRU and the foreign intelligence service SVR. The last Russian Armed Forces troops withdrew from East Germany in 1994. In the chaotic 1990s, Russia had few resources for foreign espionage and political relations with Germany were relatively good. In August 1999, Vladimir Putin was appointed Prime Minister by Boris Yeltsin and soon after he was elected president he consolidated and centralized power. His state was subsequently heavily influenced by former KGB employees and secret service officers, the siloviki. Initially, Putin maintained good contacts with the West, but beginning with the Russo-Georgian War of 2008, a new confrontation with the West began, which also had a negative impact on German-Russian relations. After the end of the Cold War, counterintelligence capacities in Germany were significantly reduced due to underfunding and staff cuts.

In January 2013, a trial began against a married couple from a small town in Hesse. Both spouses had disguised themselves as immigrants from Peru and acted as undercover agents spying for Russia for over two decades. They had used spy software to transmit military and political information to Russia. After their arrest by the GSG 9, both were sentenced to several years in prison and then moved to Russia.

On August 23, 2019, the murder of Zelimkhan Khangoshvili, a Chechen separatist who was wanted as a terrorist in Russia, took place in Berlin. The perpetrator was Russian intelligence officer Vadim Krasikov, who was sentenced to life imprisonment in December 2021. The murder is said to have been carried out on behalf of the Russian state, with local agents involved in the planning.

The German listed company Wirecard went bankrupt in June 2020 after the company was found to have committed accounting fraud amounting to billions. Wirecard COO Jan Marsalek evaded the prosecution authorities and fled to Russia. It later became known that Marsalek had been spying for Russia for years and had passed on security-relevant crypto technology to Russia. He is also alleged to have financed Russian intelligence operations and maintained contacts with the Wagner group. In Russia, Marsalek is said to have been given a new identity as an Orthodox priest with the help of the Russian intelligence service.

The Russian attack on Ukraine, which began in February 2022, led to an ice age in German-Russian relations and an intensification of the Russian government's efforts to obtain military and political secrets from the FRG, with a particular focus on secrets related to the Ukraine war, as Germany plays an important role as an arms supplier to Ukraine. The Head of the Office for the Protection of the Constitution Thomas Haldenwang announced in 2022 that Russian espionage had reached the "level of the Cold War". The NZZ described The German services were described as "hardly ready to defend themselves". Due to inadequate counterintelligence, Germany was described as a "paradise for Russian spies" and fears were expressed that foreign services would therefore no longer want to share important secret information with the FRG.

The suspected traitor Carsten L. was arrested in December 2022. The former BND employee allegedly passed on documents from the BND headquarters in Pullach to the FSB in exchange for a sum of 450,000 euros. The public prosecutor's office accused him of committing a particularly serious case of treason. The arrest of the perpetrator came a few weeks before his planned promotion to the counter-intelligence department of the BND. Through the leaked information, the Russians were able to obtain data on how German services infiltrated Russian electronic communications.

According to reports, a large proportion of Russian diplomatic personnel in Germany are being used for espionage. In March 2023, the Federal Republic of Germany had dozens of Russian diplomats expelled on the grounds that they had engaged in espionage in Germany. In retaliation, Russia also expelled German diplomats from the country. After losing a large part of its espionage network, Russia increasingly sent agents with fake identities ("illegals") into the country and tried to recruit among German Russians.

In 2023, a Bundeswehr employee working at the Federal Office of Bundeswehr Equipment, Information Technology and In-Service Support passed on secret military information to Russia. According to his own statement, he wanted to favor the Russians in their war with Ukraine in order to prevent the possible use of nukes. He approached Russian authorities himself in May 2023 and offered his services. He was sentenced to three and a half years in prison in May 2024.

In February 2024, the German Taurus leak happen. Russian intelligence services were able to intercept an almost 30-minute discussion in which senior air force officers discussed a possible delivery of German Taurus cruise missiles to Ukraine. The discussion took place via the Bundeswehr 's internal communications system and was later published by the Russian state broadcaster Russia Today.

In April 2024, two Russian-German suspected spies were arrested in Bayreuth. The two are said to have planned sabotage attacks on military infrastructure, defense plants and industrial sites to obstruct German aid to Ukraine and to have selected US bases in Germany. A total of six suspected Russian spies were arrested in April, with Interior Minister Nancy Faeser announcing the "massive strengthening of counterintelligence".

During the 2024 European Parliament elections, AfD candidate Maximilian Krah was accused of being close to pro-Russian oligarchs and intelligence service circles in May 2024. He is said to have given a suspected Russian spy access to the European Parliament, with Krah blaming one of his former employees for this.

In mid-2024, US and German intelligence stopped a Russian plot to kill Armin Papperger, the CEO of arms maker Rheinmetall. The plot was a reaction to his company sending military equipment to Ukraine. Papperger said that Russia was "not very happy" with him. He stated that the news reports were true and that investigators were "not just looking up at the sky." German Foreign Minister Annalena Baerbock warned Europeans to protect themselves and "not be naive."

In March 2026, German and Spanish authorities exposed suspected Russian spies Serhii N. and Alla S. Federal Prosecutor General claims that the pair surveilled Bavarian military drone manufacturer supplying Armed Forces of Ukraine. The GBA stated that "the defendant gathered information online and made video recordings of the individual's workplace,". Investigators suspected the surveillance was preparation for killing owner. The targeted businessman was hidden. Following his initial detention in Alicante, Spain, Serhii N. was transported to Germany in May 2026.

== Cyber attacks ==
A large-scale hacker attack on the German Bundestag in early 2015 was attributed to the Sofacy Group of the Russian GRU.

In March 2024, cyberattacks by the Cozy Bear group on German political parties were reported from February 2024 onwards. After German security authorities attributed a hacker attack on the SPD party headquarters in January 2023 to the Russian military intelligence service GRU, the Federal Foreign Office summoned a Russian embassy representative in May 2024.

== See also ==
- Austria and Russian intelligence
- Germany–Russia relations
