= Lucy spy ring =

World War II spy ring

The Lucy spy ring (German: Lucy-Spionagering) was an anti-Nazi World War II espionage operation headquartered in Switzerland and run by Rudolf Roessler, a German refugee. Its story was only published in 1966, and very little is clear about the ring, Roessler, or the effort's sources or motives.

== History ==
At the outbreak of World War II, Roessler was a political refugee from Bavaria who had fled to Switzerland when Hitler came to power. He was the founder of a small publishing firm, Vita Nova Verlag, producing copies of anti-Nazi Exilliteratur and other literary works in the German language strictly banned under censorship in Nazi Germany, for smuggling across the border and black market distribution to dissident intellectuals. Roger Masson, head of Swiss Military Intelligence, employed him as an analyst with Bureau Ha, overtly a press cuttings agency but in fact a covert department of Swiss Intelligence. Roessler was approached by two German officers, Fritz Thiele and Rudolph von Gersdorff, who were part of a German resistance conspiracy to overthrow Hitler, and had been known to Roessler in the 1930s through the Herrenklub.

Thiele and Gersdorf wished him to act as a conduit for high-level military information, to be made available to him to make use of in the fight against Nazism. This they accomplished by equipping Roessler with a radio and an Enigma machine, and designating him as a German military station (call-signed RAHS). In this way they could openly transmit their information to him through normal channels. They were able to do this as Thiele, and his superior, Erich Fellgiebel (who was also part of the conspiracy), were in charge of the German Defence Ministry's communication centre, the Bendlerblock. This was possible, as those employed to encode the information were unaware of where it was going, while those transmitting the messages had no idea what was in them.

At first Roessler passed the information to Swiss military intelligence, via a friend who was serving in Bureau Ha, an intelligence agency used by the Swiss as a cut-out. Roger Masson, the head of Swiss MI, also chose to pass some of this information to the British SIS. Later, seeking to aid the USSR in its role in the fight against Nazism, Roessler was able to pass on information to it via another contact who was a part of a Soviet (GRU) network run by Alexander Rado. Roessler was not a Communist, nor even a Communist sympathizer until much later, and wished to remain at arm's length from Rado's network, insisting on complete anonymity and communicating with Rado only through the courier, Christian Schneider. Rado agreed to this, recognizing the value of the information being received. Rado code-named the source "Lucy", simply because all he knew about the source was that it was in Lucerne.

Roessler's first major contribution to Soviet intelligence came in May 1941 when he was able to deliver details of Operation Barbarossa, Germany's impending invasion of the Soviet Union. Though his warning was initially ignored, Roessler's dates eventually proved accurate. However, a 1993 CIA study of the surviving radio traffic concluded that Roessler's group did not begin supplying Rado's network until the summer of 1942, and described the claim of an early warning about Operation Barbarossa as false. Following the invasion, in June 1941, Lucy was regarded as a VYRDO source, i.e. of the highest importance, and to be transmitted immediately. Over the next two years "Lucy" was able to supply the Soviets with high grade military intelligence. During the autumn of 1942, "Lucy" provided the Soviets with detailed information about Case Blue, the German operations against Stalingrad and the Caucasus; during this period decisions taken in Berlin were arriving in Moscow on average within a ten-hour period; on one occasion in just six hours, not much longer than it took to reach German front line units. Roessler, and Rado's network, particularly Allan Foote, Rado's main radio operator, were prepared to work flat out to maintain the speed and flow of the information. At the peak of its operation, Rado's network was enciphering and sending several hundred messages per month, many of these from "Lucy". Meanwhile, Roessler alone had to do all the receiving, decoding and evaluating of the "Lucy" messages before passing them on; for him during this period it became a full-time operation. In the summer of 1943, the culmination of "Lucy's" success came in transmitting the details of Germany's plans for Operation Citadel, a planned summer offensive against the Kursk salient, which became a strategic defeat for the German army—the Battle of Kursk gave the Red Army the initiative on the eastern front for the remainder of the war.

During the winter of 1942, the Germans became aware of the transmissions from the Rado network, and began to take steps against it through their counter-espionage bureau. After several attempts to penetrate the network they succeeded in pressuring the Swiss to close it down in October 1943, when its radio transmitters were closed down and a number of key operatives were arrested. Thereafter Roessler's only outlet for the "Lucy" information was through the Bureau Ha and Swiss Military Intelligence. Roessler was unaware his information was also going to the Western Allies.

The Lucy spy ring came to an end in the summer of 1944 when the German members, who were also involved in other anti-Nazi activities, were arrested in the aftermath of the failed 20 July plot. According to the CIA study, however, Roessler himself was arrested by the Swiss authorities on 19 May 1944, and the flow of his information to both the Soviets and the Western Allies had stopped before the 20 July plot.

== Members ==
In Switzerland the Lucy network consisted of the following members:

- Rudolf Roessler, code-named "Lucy"
- Xaver Schnieper, Roessler's Bureau Ha contact
- Christian Schneider, code-named "Taylor", Roessler's GRU contact
- Rachel Dübendorfer, code-named "Sissy", Schneider's handler
- Alexander Rado, code-named "Dora", head of the espionage group Red Three (German: Rote Drei; part of the Red Orchestra), part of the Soviet GRU espionage network in WW II in Switzerland
- Allan Foote, code-named "Jim", the "Dora" network's main radio operator

== Identity of sources ==
The record of messages transmitted show that Roessler had four important sources, codenamed Werther, Teddy, Olga, and Anna. While it was never fully discovered who they were, the quartet was responsible for 42.5 percent of the intelligence sent from Switzerland to the Soviet Union.

The search for the identity of those sources has created a very large body of work of varying quality and offering various conclusions. Several theories can be dismissed immediately, including by Foote and several other writers, that the code names reflected the sources' access type rather than their identity, for example that Werther stood for Wehrmacht, Olga for Oberkommando der Luftwaffe, Anna for Auswärtiges Amt (Foreign Office), as the evidence does not support it. Alexander Radó made this claim in his memoirs, which were examined in a Der Spiegel article.

According to a study by the CIA Historical Review Program, three and a half years before his death, in 1955, Roessler described the identity of his four sources to a confidant. They were: (1) a German major who was in charge of the Abwehr before Wilhelm Canaris: Roessler probably meant (then Major) Hans Oster, the deputy head of the Abwehr counter-espionage bureau; (2) Abwehr officer and diplomat Hans Bernd Gisevius; (3) conservative politician Carl Goerdeler; and (4) a "General Boelitz", who was by then deceased: according to the CIA 1993 study, Roessler may have meant (then Colonel) Friedrich (Fritz) Boetzel (1897–1969) from the Germany army signals intelligence agency, a misunderstanding or typing error. Boetzel died in 1969, ten years after Roessler, however, but Roessler may have thought otherwise.

The most reliable study, the CIA Historical Review Program, concluded that of the four sources, the most important source was Werther. The study stated he was likely Wehrmacht General Hans Oster, other Abwehr officers working with Swiss intelligence, or Swiss intelligence on its own.There was no evidence to link the other three codenames to known individuals. The CIA believed that the German sources gave their reports to Swiss General Staff, who in turn supplied Roessler with information that the Swiss wanted to pass to the Soviets.

== Controversy ==
Roessler's story was first published in 1966 by the French journalists Pierre Accoce and Pierre Quet. In 1981, it was alleged by two Britons Anthony Read and David Fisher that Lucy was, at its heart, a British Secret Service operation intended to get Ultra information to the Soviets in a convincing way untraceable to British codebreaking operations against the Germans. Stalin had shown considerable suspicion of any information from the British about German plans to invade Russia in 1941, so an Allied effort to find a way to get helpful information to the Soviets in a form that would not be dismissed or, at least, not implausible. That the Soviets had, via their own espionage operations, learned of the British break into important German message traffic was not, at the time, known to the British. Various observations have suggested that Allan Foote was more than a mere radio operator: he was in a position to act as a radio interface between SIS and Roessler, and also between Roessler and Moscow; his return to the West in the 1950s was unusual in several ways; and his book was similarly troublesome. They also point out that not one of Roessler's claimed sources in Germany has been identified or has come forward. Hence their suspicion that, even more so than for most espionage operations, the Lucy ring was not what it seemed.

However, this is flatly denied by Harry Hinsley, the official historian for the British Secret Services in World War II, who stated that "there is no truth in the much-publicized claim that the British authorities made use of the ‘Lucy’ ring..to forward intelligence to Moscow".

Phillip Knightley also dismisses the thesis that Ultra was the source of Lucy. He indicates that the information was delivered very promptly (often within 24 hours) to Moscow, too fast if it had come via GCHQ Bletchley Park. Further, Ultra intelligence on the Eastern front was less than complete; many of the German messages were transmitted by landlines and wireless messages were often too garbled for timely decoding. Furthermore, the Enigma systems employed by German forces on the Eastern Front were only broken intermittently. Knightley suggests that the source was Karel Sedlacek, a Czech military intelligence officer. Sedlacek died in London in 1967 and indicated that he received the information from one or more unidentified dissidents within the German High Command. Another, less likely, possibility Knightley suggests is that the information came from the Swiss secret service.

V. E. Tarrant echoes Knightley's objections, and in addition points out that Read and Fisher's scenario was unnecessary, as Britain was already passing Ultra information to the Soviet Union following the German invasion in June 1941. While not wishing to reveal Britain's penetration of Enigma, Churchill ordered selected Ultra information to be passed via the British Military Mission in Moscow, reported as coming from "a well-placed source in Berlin," or "a reliable source". However, as the Soviets showed little interest in co-operation on intelligence matters, refusing to share Soviet intelligence that would be useful to Britain (such as information on German air forces in the Eastern Front) or agreeing to use the Soviet mission in London as a transmission route, the British cut back the flow of information in the spring of 1942, and by the summer it had dwindled to a trickle. This hypothesis, that Britain lost the motivation to share intelligence with Stalin after this time, is also at variance with Read and Fisher's theory.

== See also ==
- Paul Böttcher
- Schwarze Kapelle
- Ultra

== Bibliography ==
- Accoce, Pierre; Quet, Pierre (1966). La guerre a été gagnée en Suisse [The war was won in Switzerland] (in French). Librairie Academique Perrin.
- Knightley, Phillip (1986). The Second Oldest Profession: Spies and Spying in the Twentieth Century. Norton. ISBN 978-0-393-02386-2.
- Read, Anthony; Fisher, David (1981). Operation Lucy: Most Secret Spy Ring of the Second World War. New York: Coward, McCann & Geoghegan. ISBN 0-698-11079-X.
- Tarrant, V. E. (1995). The Red Orchestra. London, UK: Cassel. ISBN 0-304-35129-6.
