= Margrit Bolli =

Swiss dancer

Venerable Margrit Bolli
- Born: 15 December 1919; Basel (BS), Switzerland
- Died: 13 October 2017 (aged 97); Therwil (BL), Switzerland
- Occupations: Dancer; Radio operator (espionage)
- Known for: Involvement with "Red Three", opposition to German National Socialism
- Political party: KPS

Margrit Bolli (15 December 1919 - 13 October 2017) was a Swiss dancer, better known to students of espionage during the Second World War as a radio operator for the "Red Three", the Swiss branch of the so-called "Red Orchestra". "Red Orchestra" was the umbrella term used by the German security services to identify a widely dispersed network of anti-(German) government resistance activists. The German authorities, and many commentators following their lead, operated according to the simplifying assumption that the entire "Red Orchestra" was a coherent network directed by Soviet intelligence. The reality was a little more nuanced, but many of the most effective resistance activists were indeed committed communists, and many did maintain close links to Moscow. For this, the work of politically engaged radio operators such as Margrit Bolli was vital.

== Life and work ==
Margareta/Margaret Bolli was born in Basel. Her father was a known anti-fascist, originally from Italy. She had trained as a dancer, but was not always able to earn enough to live on simply from her dancing. By October 1941 she was working as a waitress at a café in Bern. According to some sources it was at the café in Bern that she was engaged in conversation by a man who turned out to be Sándor Radó (though he used many names). Radó was working for Soviet intelligence as organiser of a spy cell known (misleadingly) as "the Red Three". According to other sources, it was not in Bern that Radó introduced himself to Bolli but, early in 1942, in Geneva, where she was working at the time as a cashier at the "Restaurant Stäffen". An English-language source identifies Bolli at this time as "a twenty-two-year-old Swiss Communist from Basel" and states that Sándor Radó made his approaches to Bolli on the recommendation of the (since 1940, illegal) Swiss Communist Party. Implicitly, their meeting constituted some sort of a recruitment exercise. Radó advised his new comrade to learn French and perfect her touch-typing skills. (As a young woman with an Italian father living in Basel, she was presumably already fluent in Italian and German.) In the words of one source Bolli also, for some time "satisfied [Radó's] amorous needs". A little later Bolli relocated to Lausanne, a forty minute train ride along the northern lake-shore from Geneva, where during the early part of 1942 she lived for a time with relatives. Someone else who moved to Lausanne was Alexander Foote, a British veteran of the Spanish Civil War who had grown up in Yorkshire. He is frequently identified in sources as a "double agent". He was much prized by his Soviet handlers for his expertise as a radio operator, though in the eyes of admirers he was, in fact, something of an "espionage all-rounder". Foote had been sent to teach Margrit Bolli his craft. Topics covered included Morse code and encryption techniques. Bolli was an enthusiastic and attentive student. Comrades were reassured, both by her evident commitment to the cause and by her father's political record, that she could be trusted. Her skills were quickly brought up to standard, and Radó agreed to pay her a monthly salary of 400 francs.

In September 1942 Bolli moved back to Geneva. The move was prompted by her father's fears of her being caught up in a police search if she remained in Lausanne. In Geneva she was to work as the fourth (or, by some criteria, third) member of a group of radio operators under the direction of Sándor Radó], who was working at the time under the code name of "Albert". Bolli was using cover name, "Rosa". Between October 1942 and March 1943 her work involved receiving and passing on encrypted messages. Her workplace became a one-room city-centre apartment in a block at "rue Henri Mussard 8", close to the lake. Her working hours were "principally at night". Other sources are more specific, stating that she transmitted three times per week night for up to one hour, between midnight and one in the morning. She used a radio transmitter provided by Radó, which was concealed within the casing of a portable "gramophone". There were others in Radó's team of radio operators. Bolli, when she joined, became the third or fourth member of an existing group. It was probably one of these, Edmond Hamel (cover name "Eduard") who obtained the necessary components from - somewhere - and assembled the radio transmitter without knowing who it was for, and Alexander Foote (cover name "Jim") who installed it in her apartment. Edmond Hamel and his wife Olga (cover name "Maud") were already using a similar device in their own homebase, a "luxury villa" on the edge of the city. Positioning the antenna so that it would not be detected, but nevertheless provide a sufficiently powerful signal, was a particular challenge. Radó and his team evidently had access, between them, to the necessary expertise. Evidently Radó was well pleased with the quality of Bolli's work. Her monthly salary was increased to 600 francs, plus an allowance to cover repair expenses for the equipment and living costs. It was significantly more than she could have earned as an out-of-work dancer taking work as a waitress, though Bolli's driving motivation, in the view of commentators, was not based on the money she was receiving.

During the early or middle part of 1943 (sources differ over the relevant dates) Margrit Bolli met Hans Peters, a charming man from Germany who was living in Geneva, working as a hairdresser. He had stayed in neutral Switzerland after war broke out in Germany, he explained, because he was an antifascist. If, as some supposed, Bolli was still sharing her bed with Radó, the arrangement now came to an end. Hans Peters became the grand love of Margrit Bolli's life. However, Hans Peters turned out to be not as he seemed. He had in reality, been a member of Switzerland's semi-legal National Socialist movement since the 1930s. He was also working as a secret agent for the German security services. At the time of his meeting he was on a special mission for Section 3 of the German Intelligence service. This was the section concerned with counter-intelligence. Within the intelligence services, Hans Peters was identified by the code name "Romeo". Some sources indicate that his initial meeting up with Bolli was a lucky happenstance. Elsewhere it is indicated that he was on a clearly defined mission which involved targeting Alexander Radó's little "Red Three" group of information sharers.

According to one source, Peters stole an unencrypted message in Bolli's apartment as early as 16 March 1943, from which decoders in Berlin were soon able to decipher all the messages (which they were already intercepting) that Bolli (and other cell members) were transmitting to (as it turned out) Moscow. Other sources indicate that Peters only appeared on the scene a few months later. The code used for the messages involved using a novel called "Es begann im September" by Grete von Urbanitzky, both for encryption and for decoding. Sources differ as to whether Bolli told Peters that the novel was being used in this way, or whether she remained totally unaware that Peters had somehow worked out the book's significance in the context of her secret work. It seems unlikely, in any case, that she was aware at the time that her "antifascist" lover was in frequent contact with Hermann Henseler, an apparently low-level consular worker at the German consulate in Geneva.

== Arrest ==
When Peters and Bolli were arrested, it was the Swiss security services who came for them. They were in the apartment together when the counter-intelligence officers arrived on 13 October 1943. The Swiss police had been looking for the three transmitter locations in Geneva and Lausanne for around a month. Bolli had become aware some weeks earlier that her apartment was under surveillance; and she had asked Radó to remove the transmitter and its "portable gramophone" disguise casing. At the time of her arrest the transmitter had already been removed, but other pieces of tell-tale evidence - notably a set of headphones for the radio - were still in the apartment. It was believed by cell members that the Swiss authorities had almost certainly been alerted to their activities by German intelligence. It might, indeed, have been thanks to German technology that the transmitters were so precisely and so quickly located. Badoglio had surrendered southern Italy to the advancing Anglo-American armies in September 1943, following which Germany poured troops into northern Italy, presenting an obvious threat to Swiss neutrality. The Swiss government knew from their own intelligence sources that at the start of 1943, Hitler had ordered his generals to draw up a plan for the invasion of Switzerland. Commentators with the benefit of hindsight can assert with confidence that those plans should not have been taken too seriously, but it is not clear that Roger Masson and the Swiss intelligence services which he led felt able to be so relaxed about the reports received during 1943. The Swiss authorities found themselves under intensified pressure to show a collaborative face to the government in Berlin. Following her arrest, Bolli told the Swiss authorities that she had indeed been working for Radó, because she saw it as a way to fight against National Socialism.

The wheels of justice turned slowly: as they did so, war ended. The political climate across Europe changed completely, along with the political map. Margrit Bolli was represented by Jacques Chamorel, a defence attorney from francophone Lausanne, who would later transfer into national politics as a Liberal. Eventually Bolli faced trial alongside Alexander Foote and two fellow foot soldier members from Radó's Geneva-based cell of information sharers before a Swiss military tribunal and was convicted, in 1947, on a charge that she had undertaken intelligence work against foreign states. The matter had become caught up in post-war international politics, and despite a widespread perception, based on overwhelming evidence, that Radó (and thereby his group) had been working for Soviet intelligence, the Soviet authorities now communicated to the Swiss their concern that the group's information sharing (presumably in the context of their transmissions having been intercepted and decoded by German intelligence) had been to the detriment of the Soviet cause. Bolli was sentenced with a ten month jail term and a fine of 500 francs.

Before 1945 the Swiss journalist Otto Pünter had worked in parallel with Alexander Radó and, it is generally believed, been involved in passing information to Soviet intelligence, though information as to the precise nature and extent of his intelligence activities during the war years remains very incomplete. He paid for a guarantee on Bolli's behalf, described in an English-language CIA report as "her bail", as a result of which she never served her jail term. Elsewhere it is indicated that it was because Otto Pünter interceded on her behalf with his own contacts inside Swiss intelligence service that she remained at liberty. The two explanations are not, of course, mutually exclusive. Freedom remained conditional, to the extent that right up till the 1970s, Margareta Schatz (as she had become known following her marriage) was still being required to report regularly to her local police station.

Little more was heard of Margrit Bolli. At some point she married a businessman called Artur Schatz. A CIA report records that in September 1947 the couple were spotted visiting Rome. There is a further report that in 1956 they were living in Basel.

By the time she died, on 13 October 2017, Margarete Schatz was living at Therwil (Arlesheim), just outside Basel on its south side, behind Binningen.

== In popular culture ==
Heidi Specogna's documentary film "Deckname: Rosa" ("Cover name: Rosa"), produced in 1993, covered Bolli's involvement with the Red Three between 1941 and 1943. The film includes interview material with Bolli, who by the time it was made was the only member of Sándor Radó's group of communications experts still alive.
