= Friedrich Boetzel =

German army general

Friedrich Boetzel (1897 – 23 June 1969, in Bad Neuenahr) was a Brigadier general of the army of the Bundeswehr. During World War II Boetzel was an intelligence officer who was Director of Operations of the Cipher Department of the High Command of the Wehrmacht from 1939 to 1943. His cover name there was Bernhard

== Career ==
From 1934 to 1939, Oberst Fritz Boetzel, was the officer responsible for the German Defense Ministry's signals intelligence agency, during the important interwar period, when the service was being enlarged and professionalised,

In 1939, he was posted to Army Group Southeast (German: Heeresgruppe Südost) to take up the office position of Chief of Intelligence Evaluation in Athens, Greece. In 1944, following the reorganisation of the Wehrmacht signals intelligence capability, Fritz Boetzel, now General Fritz Boetzel, who was promoted by Albert Praun, created 12 Communications Reconnaissance Battalions (KONA regiment) in eight regiments, with each regiment assigned to a particular Army Group. From October 1944 he was posted to direct the office of the General der Nachrichtenaufklärung.

Fritz Boetzel was considered to be one of the sources for the Lucy spy ring. Boetzel knew Hans Oster and Wilhelm Canaris and had fit the anti-Nazi personality of Rudolf Roessler contacts, the man who had run the spy ring.

== Post War ==
After the war, Boetzel was subordinated to the Bundeswehr. In May 1956 he was given the leadership of the newly founded "Service for Telecommunications Reconnaissance and Key Affairs" in Ahrweiler. This was later renamed "Telecommunications Service of the Bundeswehr" in 1958, then in 1964 to the "Office for Telecommunications of the Bundeswehr", later again in 1979 to the "Office for Intelligence of the Federal Armed Forces". Bundeswehr" and most recently in 2002 in the "Centre for Intelligence of the Bundeswehr"). It dissolved at the end of 2007.

== See also ==
- Cipher Department of the High Command of the Wehrmacht Boetzel was director of this unit during part of the interwar period.
