= Sichere Inter-Netzwerk Architektur =

Cryptographic system

Sichere Inter-Netzwerk Architektur (SINA) is a cryptographic system developed by and a product of the Bundesamt für Sicherheit in der Informationstechnik, an arm of the German government. It also has the anglicized name Secure Inter-Network Architecture. As of April 2024 the cryptosystem was employed by "many European governments for transmitting classified information".

== History ==
SINA came to prominence in March 2023 when it was divulged in a court warrant for the arrest of the Austrian intelligence officer Egisto Ott, who has a relationship with Wirecard fraudster Jan Marsalek, that a SINA laptop was handed to the Russian secret services, specifically the Lubyanka Building office of the FSB.

The Austrian authorities report that Ott received €20,000 for the laptop from Marsalek.
