= Austria and Russian intelligence =

Surveillance ties between Austria and Russia

Due to domestic policies and a history of neutrality, Austria has for decades been a center for intelligence activities in Europe. Together with Belgium, it has been considered a hub for Russian intelligence. Austria's role in espionage, particularly as a base for Russian intelligence operations, has been noted by several media outlets. Because of this, Eastern Europeans have at times referred to Austria as "Russia's Trojan horse in Western Europe". New Statesman has described Austria as "Russia's tunnel into the heart of Europe" and that Austria is a "compromised state", with the country's attachment to neutrality leading it to cultivate "obsequious relations with Russian energy and espionage". Financial Times have referred to the Austrian domestic intelligence agency BVT as "regarded as being so compromised that for a time it was cut out of much European intelligence sharing activity".

After the Russian invasion of Ukraine in 2022, Russian influence and intelligence in Austria came under wider international and domestic scrutiny.

== Background ==
Austria moved towards official neutrality in the 1950s, with laws only making espionage a crime if directed against Austria. There is also a high concentration of nongovernmental and international organizations in Austria, influencing its attractiveness for foreign intelligence. Among others, Vienna is home to the Organization for Security and Co-operation in Europe (OSCE) and one headquarters of the United Nations. In addition to embassies, countries may have up to two additional diplomatic missions to the international organisations, giving diplomatic immunity. Austria's history as a center of espionage is also due to its location centrally in Europe: during the First Cold War, Austria was a neutral state near the Iron Curtain. According to Siegfried Beer, founder of the Austrian Center for Intelligence, Propaganda and Security Studies, "[t]he Austrian government was eager to remain neutral. So it developed an atmosphere in which everybody was pretty cosy and profited from each other. [...] Espionage was a business. It still is. It brings a lot of people with a lot of money and a lot of support into the country." According to New Statesman, "Russian diplomatic presence in Vienna is abnormally large and its enormous permanent mission to the United Nations is, experts believe, a hub of intelligence activity".

In 1968 Austria became the first western European country to import Soviet gas. Austria grew to a major hub for delivering gas to Italy, Germany and France. Austrian companies, especially in the energy sector, have become deeply entwined with Russia; at the end of 2021 Russian companies held $25.5 billion assets in Austria. Russia was per 2022 the second largest investor in Austria, after Germany. According to an estimate from the Bank for International Settlements, Austrian banks in 2022 were exposed to $17.5 billion in Russian debt. Before the 2022 war, Austria got 80% of its natural gas from Russia, while 1/4 of all Russian gas deliveries to the EU flowing through the Austrian Baumgarten hub.

Cultural ties are also close, with a prominent Russian presence in several Austrian cultural institutions. Austria's role in foreign intelligence inspired The Third Man, which was inspired by Austrian journalist Peter Smolka.

After the Russian annexation of Crimea in 2014, Austria was the first Western country to welcome Putin for a visit.

Politically, ties between Austria and Russia have been warm and, to some partners, controversial. Political ties with the far-right Freedom Party have been particularly close. According to The Washington Post, there has been a "revolving door [...] between the highest ranks of the Austrian government and major Russian state companies". High-ranking Austrian officials moving to Russian business include former chancellors Wolfgang Schüssel and Christian Kern, who became members of the boards of Lukoil and Russian Railways respectively. Additionally, former foreign minister Karin Kneissl joined Rosneft, as well as began writing for RT as an opinion columnist. Tensions with the West increased after the Kurz government took office in December 2017.

== Overview ==
Austria's close relationship with Russia has strained relations and co-operation with several Western countries. New Statesman states that Austria's European partners consider Austria's intelligence services and defense ministry to be "jeopardised" and "unreliable". Financial Times, quoting an anonymous source, referred to Austria as a "veritable aircraft carrier" of Russian intelligence activity, and Austria's defense ministry as "practically a department of the GRU. An Austrian official refused to comment on anonymous allegations, but pointed to an ongoing reform in the security services. Several European intelligence agencies are said to have restricted intelligence-sharing with Austrian intelligence officials. Among others, Reuters reported both British MI5 and the Dutch intelligence agency "heavily restricted" intelligence sharing with Austria, primarily due to the ties between the Freedom Party and Russia. The Freedom Party, a junior coalition partner in the Kurz government, controlled most of the security apparatus, as well as the Defence Ministry and Interior Ministry — and therefore the BVT.

According to Chris Miller, professor at the Fletcher School of Law and Diplomacy at Tufts University, the "Austrian and Hungarian governments are notorious for their open-door attitude toward Russian agents". According to Gerhard Mangott, Professor of International Relations at the University of Innsbruck, it is "common knowledge" that agents often try to recruit Austrian informants, stating "[t]he Secret Services are very active in Austria on a bilateral basis, trying to win over informants from various institutions". In 2018, the head of the BVT, Peter Gridling, declined to comment on exact numbers of foreign agents operating there, but said it was "a community of hundreds of people" and in the same year, Siegfried Beer estimated that the amount of spies masquerading as diplomats in Austria was around 7000.

Austria's role as a neutral "spy haven" played a part in it being the setting in 2010 for the largest spy swap between the U.S. and Russia since the First Cold War.

NBC reported in 2018 that the pro-Russian Freedom Party's control of intelligence services "led to fears that Western secrets aren't safe any more" in Austria. Gustav Gressel, a former desk officer at the Austrian Ministry of Defense, predicted "Austria is part of the European Union defense policy, and whatever is agreed and discussed there will be leaked to Moscow". The 2018 raid on Austria's intelligence agency is alleged by some sources to have been instigated by Russian intelligence through manipulation of the FPÖ.

In 2018, an Austrian colonel came under investigation on allegations he had spied for Russia since the 1990s. The case was described as a "particular embarrassment to Austria" by the BBC. In 2020, the man was sentenced for betraying state secrets and spying for the GRU for over 25 years.

In 2019, German federal police (BKA) raised concerns that Austrian intelligence agents aided Russian intelligence services, alleging two Austrian agents – one of them Egisto Ott – had passed on sensitive information to Russia. The German statement came weeks after a Georgian of Chechen descent was assassinated in Berlin, on behalf of Russian authorities.

Also in 2019, the head of BVT informed that despite the agency not taking part in the working groups of the Club of Bern, due to concern from members of leaks, it was still a member. In an annual report, the BVT has itself stated that Austria is a "favored area of operations" for a "high" number of spies.

In the wake of the Skripal poisonings, Austria was one of few EU countries not to expel Russian diplomats.

The Kurz government including the Freedom Party collapsed in 2019, after a video emerged showing Heinz-Christian Strache, vice chancellor and Freedom Party leader, apparently accepting an offer of financing from a woman pretending to be the niece of a Russian oligarch.

In June 2020, a retired member of the Austrian military was sentenced to three years in prison after being found guilty of spying for Russian authorities.

Christo Grozev, formerly of Bellingcat, has claimed that while doing investigations in Austria, he was surveilled by Austrian intelligence at the explicit order of Russia. Due to Russia's "deep penetration" of Austria, he has called it the least safe European country; he later fled country after being told by Austrian authorities that it was unsafe for him to stay.

=== Ott case ===
The Ott case has become emblematic of "Russia's deep penetration of European Union member Austria in politics and industry as well as the intelligence field", according to The Washington Post. It was one of the reasons for the dissolution of the domestic intelligence agency BVT, and the severing or curtailing of intelligence sharing by some other European intelligence agencies. Ott himself has denied all allegations, claiming a conspiracy against him for being a whistle-blower.

Former Austrian intelligence officer and undercover agent handler Egisto Ott is suspected of selling state secrets to Russia, as well as giving information on Kremlin enemies in the West. He is also accused of forming a plan with other officers to reorganize the security services as a new department of the Foreign Ministry, at a time when the Ministry was led by the controversially pro-Russian Freedom Party member Karin Kneissl; there is no indication in investigative documents that she was aware of the plan. Ott was also in possession of an analysis of the shortcomings of Russia's Berlin operation, with recommendations of how to improve it.

Between 2017 and 2021, Ott is alleged to have been working with former intelligence official Martin Weiss, and businessman Jan Marsalek. Weiss has admitted passing on requests for searches into personal data and background information, which he would submit to Ott on behalf of Marsalek. German officials are probing links between Marsalek and Russian intelligence, including whether his former company served as a money laundering operation for Russian money.

Ott had been under suspicion for years before his arrest in 2021. Early in 2017, Austrian officials had allegedly been warned by CIA that Ott was suspected of selling information to Russia. In November that year, according to Die Presse, American officials threatened to withdraw from a security conference in the Netherlands if Ott attended. The ultimatum led to a search warrant, but produced little important evidence. Despite this, Ott was transferred to a police academy, where he is accused of having requested hundreds of illegal searches in personal information databases, including on Bellingcat director Christo Grozev, who told The Washington Post that authorities had concluded it was done on behalf of Russia.

The Austrian authorities report that Ott received €20,000 for a SINA laptop from Marsalek.

=== Russian invasion of Ukraine ===
In the wake of the 2022 Russian invasion of Ukraine, Austrian officials have "accelerated a reckoning" on Russian influence, launching probes and hearings on Russian interference in intelligence services and business links of Austrian political figures to Russian companies.

Austria initially opposed disconnecting Russia from SWIFT, with the European subsidiary of Sberbank being located in Vienna, and Austrian bank Raiffeisen Bank International (RBI) having a large presence in Russia. RBI is Austria's second-biggest bank, and made 35% of its 2021 profits in Russia. Also located in Vienna is offshoots of Lukoil, Gazprom and Sibur. Several oligarchs have also invested heavily in Austrian property.

After the invasion, OMV announced an inquiry into Rainer Seele's tenure, a German national, looking into contracts said to have made Austria dependent on Russian gas. Mark Garrett, chairman of OMV's supervisory board, told shareholders in June that "[l]ooking back, we have to conclude that the investments made in Russia after 2015 were based on too much trust in Russia and Russia's role in the international community". Austria had been a major investor in Nord Stream 2, initially resisting scrapping the project in the wake of the Russian invasion. Less than two weeks after OMV announcing an investigation, Gazprom informed they would cut the volume of gas delivered to Austria.

On 7 April 2022, in the wake of the Bucha massacre discoveries, Austria expelled four Russian diplomats although only stating the diplomats had "acted in a way that is inconsistent with their diplomatic status". This was described as a "highly unusual step" by New Statesman.

== See also ==
- Austria–Russia relations
- Alfred Redl
- Russian espionage in Germany
