= Otto Pünter =

Swiss journalist and anti-Nazi resistance fighter

- Otto Pünter
- Born: 4 April 1900; Bern, Switzerland
- Died: 13 October 1988 (aged 88); Bern, Switzerland
- Espionage activity
- Service branch: Red Orchestra
- Service years: 1939–1945
- Codename: Pakbo

Otto Pünter (4 April 1900 – 13 October 1988) was a Swiss journalist and anti-Nazi resistance fighter. During the Second World War, his codename was Pakbo, and he was a member of the Rote Drei.

== Personal life ==
Pünter was born in Bern, Switzerland. His father was a merchant. He gained an apprenticeship from the University of Neuchâtel. Afterwards, he lived in France, Spain and the United Kingdom.

== Career ==
In 1928, Pünter was a founding member of the socialist news agency INSA. INSA aimed to spread anti-fascist news and worked with anti-fascist groups in Italy. Through this role, Pünter met many Italian informants. Pünter was also suspected to be a secret member of the Communist Party of Switzerland, and he saw Stalinism as less evil than fascism, Nazism, and Francoism. During the Spanish Civil War, it was claimed that Pünter built his own intelligence network, in order to sell secrets to the French and British. He also met many Soviet GRU agents, and decided to become a Soviet spy.

During the Second World War, Pünter was a member of the Red Orchestra, and the Red Three. His codename was Pakbo, or sometimes Paquebot, and Pünter worked with the Soviet intelligence agencies. His encryption methods included crosswords and lemon juice. Others in the movement included Georges Blun (codename Long) and Rachel Dübendorfer (codename Sissy), and they collaborated with Hungarian spy Alexander Radó. Pünter helped Georges Blun to become part of Radó's network, and Pünter also managed a Yugoslav spy codenamed Gabel, and a German social democrat codenamed Poisson. Radó was accused of using Pünter to sell information to the British secret service.

In 1941, Pünter claimed he had intelligence from the French of the German invasion of the USSR; his source was said to be Rudolf Roessler. The information was believed to be fabricated. Pünter also claimed to have received information from German general Alfred Jodl, and had a team of agents in a secret monastery location in the Alps. None of these claims have ever proved to have been true. However, the USSR saw Pünter as an important ally, and Pünter was called one of the most useful agents in Switzerland.

After the War, he became President of the Association of Federal Parliament Journalists. From 1956 to 1965, he was the head of public relations of the Swiss Broadcasting Corporation (SRG). Afterwards, he worked as a district judge. In 1966, he appeared on a panel discussion show about Switzerland's involvement in the Second World War.

== Awards ==
In 1948, he was awarded the Turin journalism prize. In 1975, he was awarded the Hans Bredow medal for services to radio. The ceremony was in West Berlin.

== Works ==
- Pünter, Otto, Wie es war: Erinnerungen eines Journalisten, 1919–1977 (How it was: memories of a journalist, 1919–1977), Cosmos-Verlag, 1977 ISBN 978-3856210311
- Pünter, Otto, Payot, Marc, Guerre secrète en pays neutre: Les révélations d'un agent secret sur l'espionnage en Suisse contre le fascisme et Hitler 1930–1945 (Secret war in a neutral country: The revelations of a secret agent on espionage in Switzerland against fascism and Hitler 1930–1945), 1967
