= Rudolf Roessler =

German anti-Nazi and spy for the Soviet Union (1897–1958)

- Roessler along with Xaver Schnieper, who is not shown, being escorted by Swiss authorities in 1953 during his arrest.
- Born: 22 November 1897; Kaufbeuren, Bavaria, German Empire
- Died: 11 December 1958 (aged 61); Kriens, Switzerland
- Other name: Lucy or Lucie
- Occupations: Journalist, publisher, editor, informant
- Years active: 1939–1943
- Organization: Rote Drei

Rudolf Roessler (German: Rößler; 22 November 1897 – 11 December 1958) was a Protestant German and a dedicated anti-Nazi. During the interwar period, Roessler was a lively cultural journalist, with a focus on theatre. In 1934, Roessler became stateless by Germany and as a political refugee, moved to Lucerne in Switzerland. There he established a small anti-Nazi publishing firm known as Vita Nova that published Exilliteratur by fellow exiled writers. Late in the summer of 1942, Roessler ran the Lucy spy ring, an anti-Nazi espionage operation that was part of the Red Three while working for Rachel Dübendorfer through the cut-out Christian Schneider (editor). Roessler was able to provide a great quantity of high-quality intelligence, around 12,000 typed pages, sourced from the German High Command of planned operations on the Eastern Front, usually within a day of operational decisions being made. Later in the war, Roessler was able to provide the Soviet Union with intelligence on the V-1 and V-2 missiles. During the Cold War, Roessler reactivated his network and he spied on NATO countries in Western Europe under orders from the military intelligence services of the Czechoslovak Republic, until he was arrested by the Swiss authorities and convicted of espionage in 1953.

== Early life ==
Roessler was born on 22 November 1897 in Kaufbeuren, Kingdom of Bavaria. His father was Lutheran Bavarian Forestry official Georg Roessler and his mother was Sophie née Kleemann. He was the youngest of five children. Roessler graduated from St Anna High School in Augsburg at the age of 17.

== Military career ==
When he was eighteen, Roessler was drafted into the 120th (2nd Württemberg) Infantry "Emperor William, King of Prussia" regiment of the Imperial German Army in Ulm in 1916. On 28 April 1916, he was convicted following court martial under German military law of going AWOL from his unit and sentenced to 5 months and 15 days in military prison; an appeal against this was unsuccessful. Roessler was pardoned to serve at the front on 15 July. First he was commanded to the Battle of the Somme, one of the most costly battles of World War I on the Western Front. After the failed British breakthrough attempts came to an end, Roessler took part in trench warfare on the slightly dented German front from 27 November to 21 December. After serving at the front, he developed a lengthy stomach and intestinal illness near Arras and was admitted to the Denain and Tegel hospitals for treatment.

From 25 May to 12 July 1917, Roessler's unit was deployed to an area south of Ypres, that was under continuous British artillery bombardment from 21 May to 7 June. From 20 July to 10 August 1917 the unit was located in the Upper Alsace. Roessler then fought in the Third Battle of Ypres from 19 August to 10 September 1917. From 11 September to 12 November, Roessler took part in the fighting along the Hindenburg Line. On 13 November, his unit moved north. There he was removed from fighting near Hooglede on 6 December and taken to a hospital near Deinze. In January and February 1918, Roessler fought in the trenches in Flanders. His stomach and intestinal disease had not healed and he was admitted to a military hospital in Ghent on 28 February 1918, recuperating for more than a month. On 15 March 1919, he was discharged from the army.

Roessler was left with a lasting negative opinion of how the war was fought in 1916 and 1917 and the methods with which the lives of frontline soldiers were being wasted for the survival of what he increasingly saw as a power-hungry elite.

== Civilian career ==
After the end of the war, he studied theology in Augsburg. Roessler, a liberal conservative, became a pacifist and eventually an opponent of Nazism. He started working as a trainee journalist at the Munich-Augsburger Abendzeitung, a German daily newspaper which was one of the most important Catholic newspapers in Germany until it was banned by the Nazis in 1935. In 1922, Roessler founded the Augsburger Literary Society along with Bertold Brecht and others and became its chairman. Many prominent writers joined the society including Thomas Mann, Hermann Hesse, Stefan Zweig, Hermann Graf Keyserling and Fedor Stepun. In the same year he was promoted to editor, a position he held for a year.

In 1924, Roessler moved to work at the Allgemeine Zeitung, a daily newspaper printed in Bavaria as a correspondent in Augsburg. From 1925, Roessler contributed copy to the Frankfurter Zeitung, the Kölnische Zeitung and the Vossische Zeitung newspapers. From 1925 to 1927, he was editor of Form und Sinn ("Form and Sense"), a journal for art and intellectual life. Hans Carossa and Hermann Hesse published articles in this short-lived journal. On 15 July 1926, in an essay entitled Das Glaubensbekenntnis der Dichter (The Poets' Creed), Roessler himself approvingly reviewed the recently published work Das Gute (The Good) by the then well-known Basel philosopher Paul Häberlin. In it, Häberlin asserted the unity of goodness, beauty and truth in God's creation. Roessler adopted this point of view.

== Stage People's Association ==
In 1927, Roessler became associated with the Christian-conservative Bühnenvolksbund (Stage People's Association) in Berlin, which from 1919 to 1933 attempted to increase the number of people attending theatre, to ensure the advancement of German theatre stage people. The Bühnenvolksbund wanted to revive Christian plays such as Christmas, Passion, and other mystery plays. Theatres were to be encouraged to include such plays in their repertoires. However, these efforts were never successful as membership fees, even when combined with state subsidies, were insufficient to enable the organisation to maintain a stable financial position.

In 1928, Roessler became executive director and a playwright for the association, as well as head of the Bühnenvolksbund publishing house. For the next two years, Roessler edited the magazines Form und Sinn and, from August 1932, the Deutsche Bühnenblätter, a theatre magazine, and was co-editor of the Bühnenvolksbund Das Nationaltheater ("The National theatre", a magazine). In 1930, he co-wrote Thespis : das Theaterbuch ("Thespis: the Theatre Book"), which summarised theatre production in Germany from 1924 to 1929, with German art historian Oskar Fischel, German writer Walter Hollander, and Austro-German writer, poet, and art critic Theodor Däubler. Roessler was also chairman of the supervisory board of the stage companies Südwestdeutsche Bühne GmbH Frankfurt, Schlesische Bühne GmbH Breslau, and Ostpreußische Bühne GmbH Königsberg.

== Impeachment and expulsion ==
In 1932, the Militant League for German Culture (Kampfbund für deutsche Kultur, KfdK) began to found its own theatre visitors' association and to persuade at least some of the middle-class members of the Stage People's Association to join the Nazi association. Roessler opposed the ethnic politicization of theatre and the attempt to subordinate art to mass taste. Rather, he believed that art should influence mass taste. From the KfdK's point of view, this was an arrogant liberal and conservative idea. After the Reichstag elections on 5 March 1933, the Nazis quickly began to dissolve the Stage People's Association and transfer the local groups and their members and the regional associations into the ethnic Reich Association of the German Stage (Reichsverband Deutsche Bühne). The Stage People's Association at the Reich level was to be dissolved.

On 5 May 1933, the chairman of the KfdK, Hans Hinkel, who later became the third managing director of the Reich Chamber of Culture, placed Roessler on leave and prohibited him from continuing to exercise his directorship, effectively expelling him. On 8 May, the KfdK took over Roessler's desk. Roessler and Brünker (Roesslers deputy) fought for an interim injunction against the removal before the Berlin district court. The Prussian Prime Minister Hermann Göring then told the press that he would no longer tolerate the KfdK's attacks but would punish them. The KfdK actually brought back the furniture that had been taken away. However, he later withdrew the financial assets of the Stage People's Association, which were essentially funded by members' contributions.

As a result, the Stage People's Association became insolvent and the ethnic Reichsverband Deutsche Bühne e.V filed an application with the Mitte district court on 29 May 1933 to open bankruptcy proceedings because of an outstanding invoice from a typewriter supplier in the amount of 1,170 RM. On 15 June 1933, bankruptcy proceedings were opened and from then on, Roessler was without income. In 1934, an investigation was initiated against Roessler and the Sturmabteilung appeared to search his office. In May 1934, Roessler left Germany as a political refugee and emigrated to Lucerne Switzerland with his wife Olga, with the help of his friend, the Swiss librarian and Marxist Xaver Schnieper, who Roessler had met during his studies in drama in Germany.

== Vita Nova ==
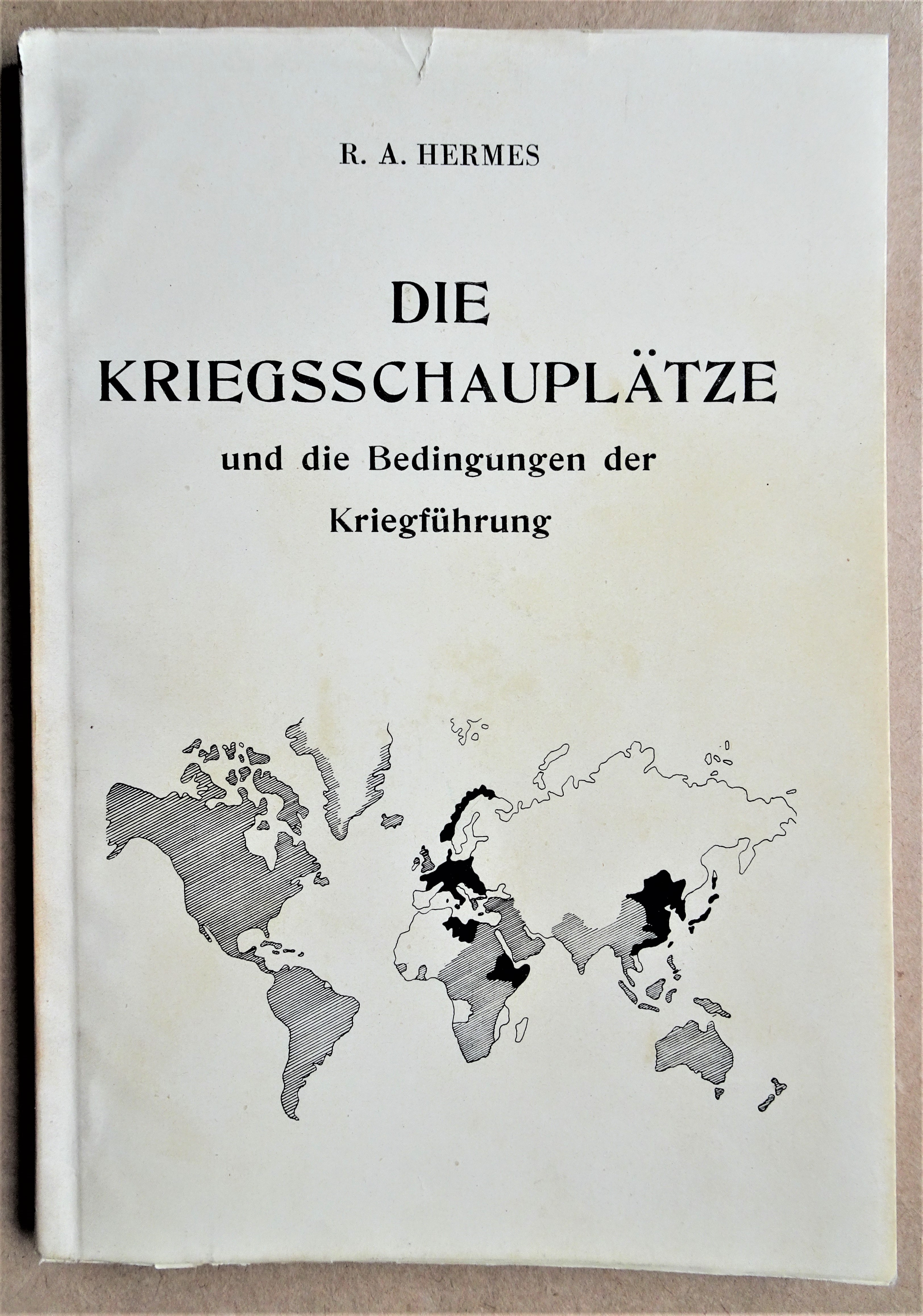
Memorandum on the future course of the war

In January 1934 and while still in Berlin, he co-founded the Vita Nova Verlag ("New Life Publisher") publishing house at 36 Fluhmattstrasse in Lucerne, Switzerland along with the Catholic bookseller Josef Stocker and the business women Henriette Racine. Stocker had been encouraged to help co-found the publishing firm by Jesuit priest and theological philosopher Otto Karrer, with the introductions arranged by Schnieper. Vita Nova was an anti-Nazi publishing house that primarily published German writers in exile. The company published some fifty brochures and books that attacked both Nazism and Stalinism, contrasting them with the Christian values of the older Germany and Russia. The small firm also published works that were critical of Francoist Spain. Indeed, the firm provided the only real publishing house in Western Europe for exiled Christian, Catholic, Protestant and Orthodox writers and playwrights to publish their work. Amongst the most notable were Russian religious philosopher Nikolai Berdyaev, Catholic philosopher Emmanuel Mounier and the German philosopher Friedrich Wilhelm Foerster.

Roessler used the pseudonym, "R. A. Hermes” to publish his own work at Vita Nova. From 1940 to 1941, Roessler wrote and published a 94-page memorandum using his Hermes pseudonym that was titled Die Kriegsschauplätze und die Bedingungen der Kriegführung (Memorandum on the war situation after the Battle of Britain) that discussed how partisans forces needed to be formed in countries that had been conquered, otherwise the country had to be dominated by forces in place. He described how Germany would fail to take this lesson into account, particularly in Poland and the Soviet Union, where the campaigns would be designed as a war of annihilation between two races and two world views.

== Expatriation ==
On 20 May 1935, the German consulate in Basel refused to issue Roessler with a new passport and he was informed privately that he was being deported, i.e. made stateless. The Nazi regime finally revoked his German citizenship in 1937. The expatriation of Roessler and his wife was officially announced in the German Reichsanzeiger newspaper, No. 96 of 28 April 1937. The reason the consulate provided for the decision was that Roessler had violated loyalty to the Reich and the people and damaged German interests. In 1940, Roessler managed to obtain a Czechoslovak passport for himself and his wife, which was issued to him by the consulate in Marseille of the no longer existing Czechoslovak Republic. In the event of a German occupation of Switzerland, he wanted to make it possible for him to leave the country.

From 1936 to 1939, Roessler worked on the semi-monthly left-wing Catholic and radically democratic journal Die Entscheidung (The Decision) that was published by Xaver Schnieper. The editors were Xaver Schnieper, the Nidwalden architect and later intelligence officer Arnold Stöckli and the lawyers Hans de Segesser-Brunegg, along with Bernhard Mayr von Baldegg with whom Roessler met regularly in private. After 1939, the editors were called up for active military service, so the publication stopped. Here Roessler published his own work using the "Arbiter” pseudonym.

== World War II ==
=== Büro Ha ===
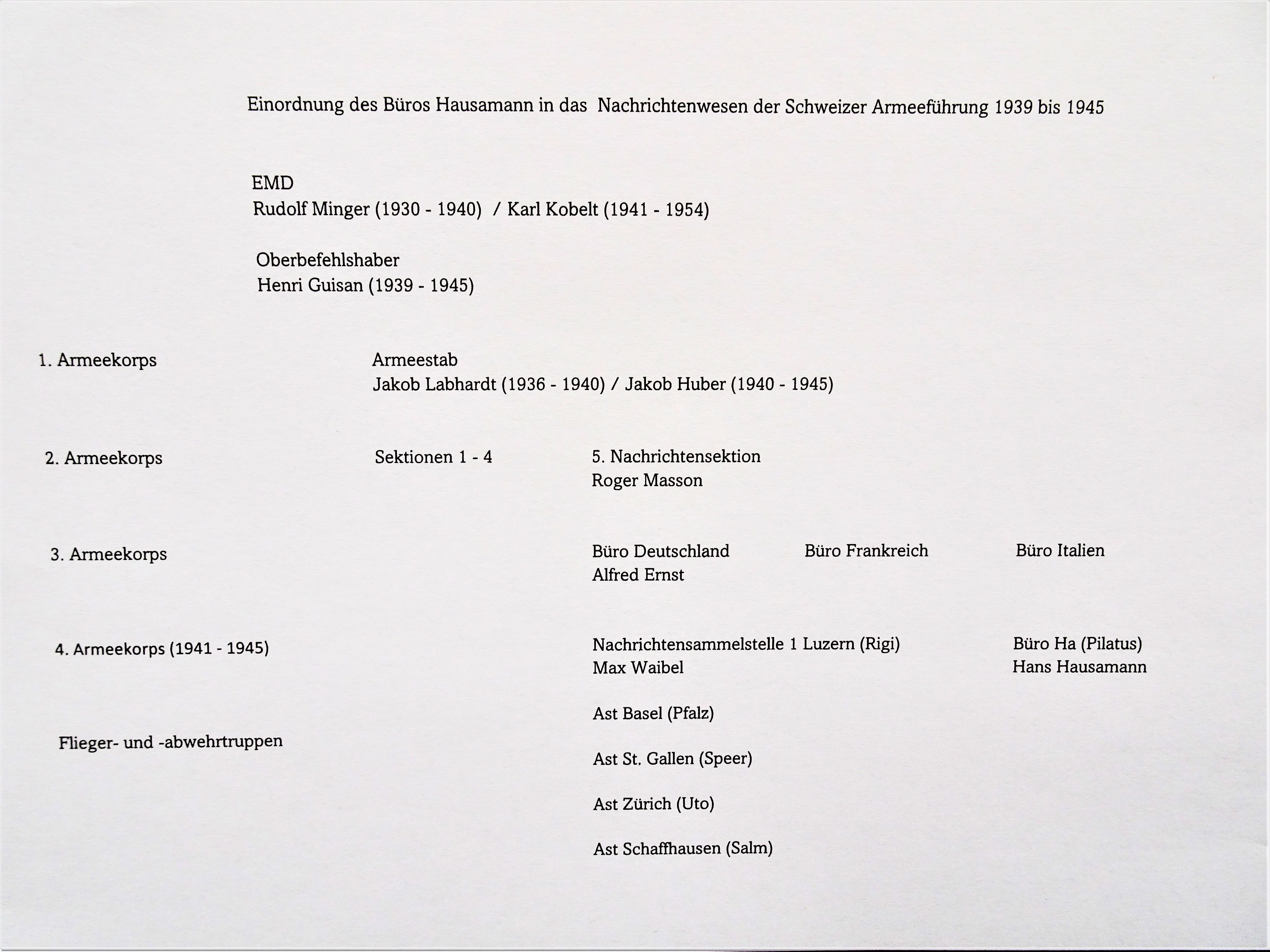
Hausamann in the structure of the Swiss intelligence service

In April 1939, Roessler's friend Schnieper met the photo dealer Hans Hausamann while on vacation in Lugano. Hausamann ran a press service and specialised in military intelligence from 1935 onwards. Schnieper shared his political views, so Hausamann asked him to find him an employee. Schnieper suggested his university friend Franz Wallner, who was able to fulfill the intelligence service tasks assigned to him. Hausamann therefore asked Schnieper to find another employee who was familiar with conditions in Germany and would be a reliable informant. Schnieper suggested his friend Roessler. Roessler anticipated that the Nazis would soon launch a military attack on Switzerland and therefore agreed to work with Hausamann. but only on the condition that the offer was official. At that time, Schnieper was working as a junior officer in the Swiss military intelligence agency Büro Ha, at the time located near Teufen, and he introduced Roessler to Major Hausamann. However, he avoided meeting with him personally, so Hausamann used Franz Wallner, who lived in Lucerne, as an intermediary. From the summer of 1939 to May 1944, he sent him 80-130 individual reports per month but Hausamann did not pass on any information to Roessler. Roessler became one of the most important sources of intelligence for Büro Ha.

=== Rote Drei ===
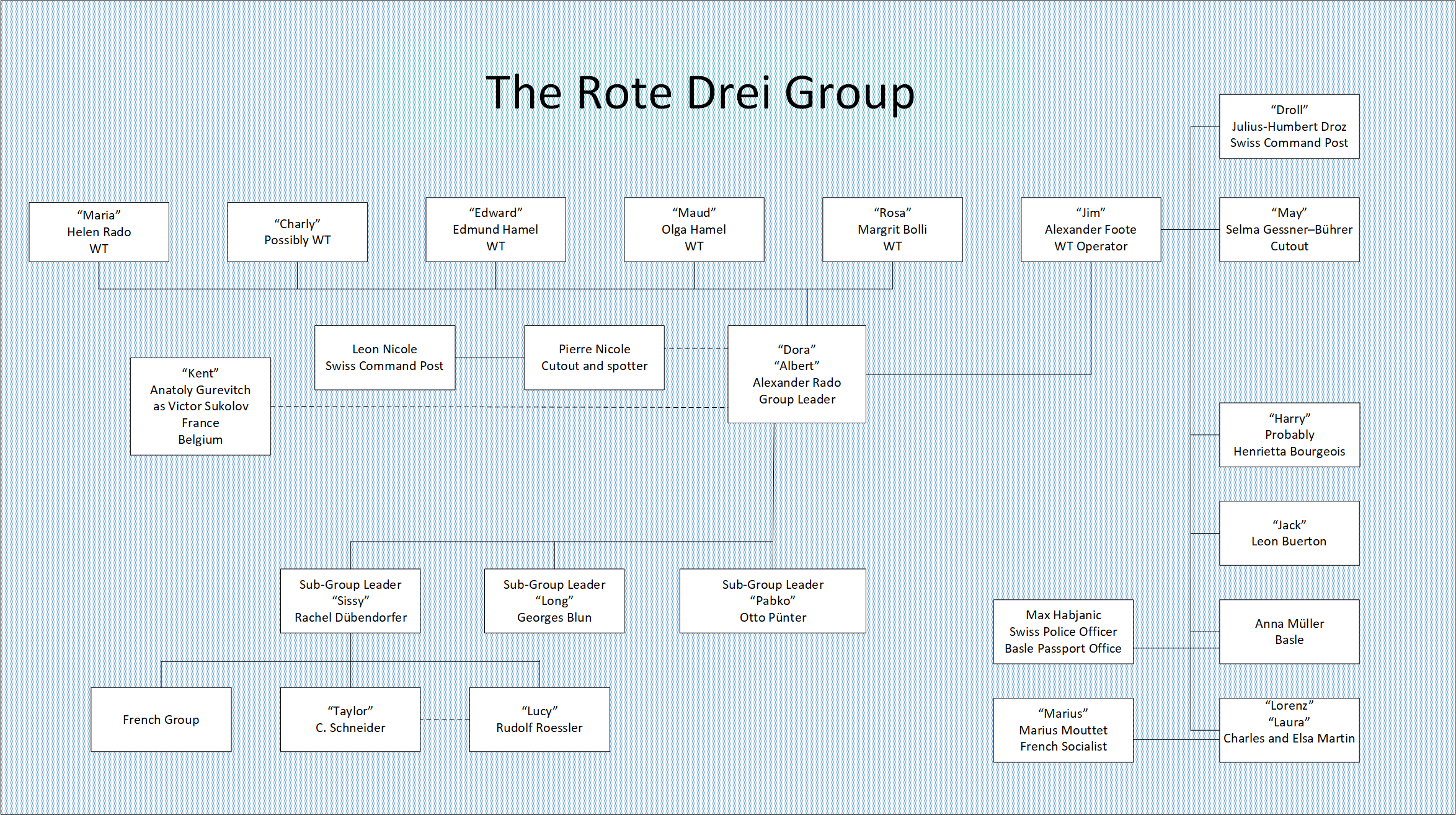
Organisational diagram of the core members of the Rote Drei in Switzerland

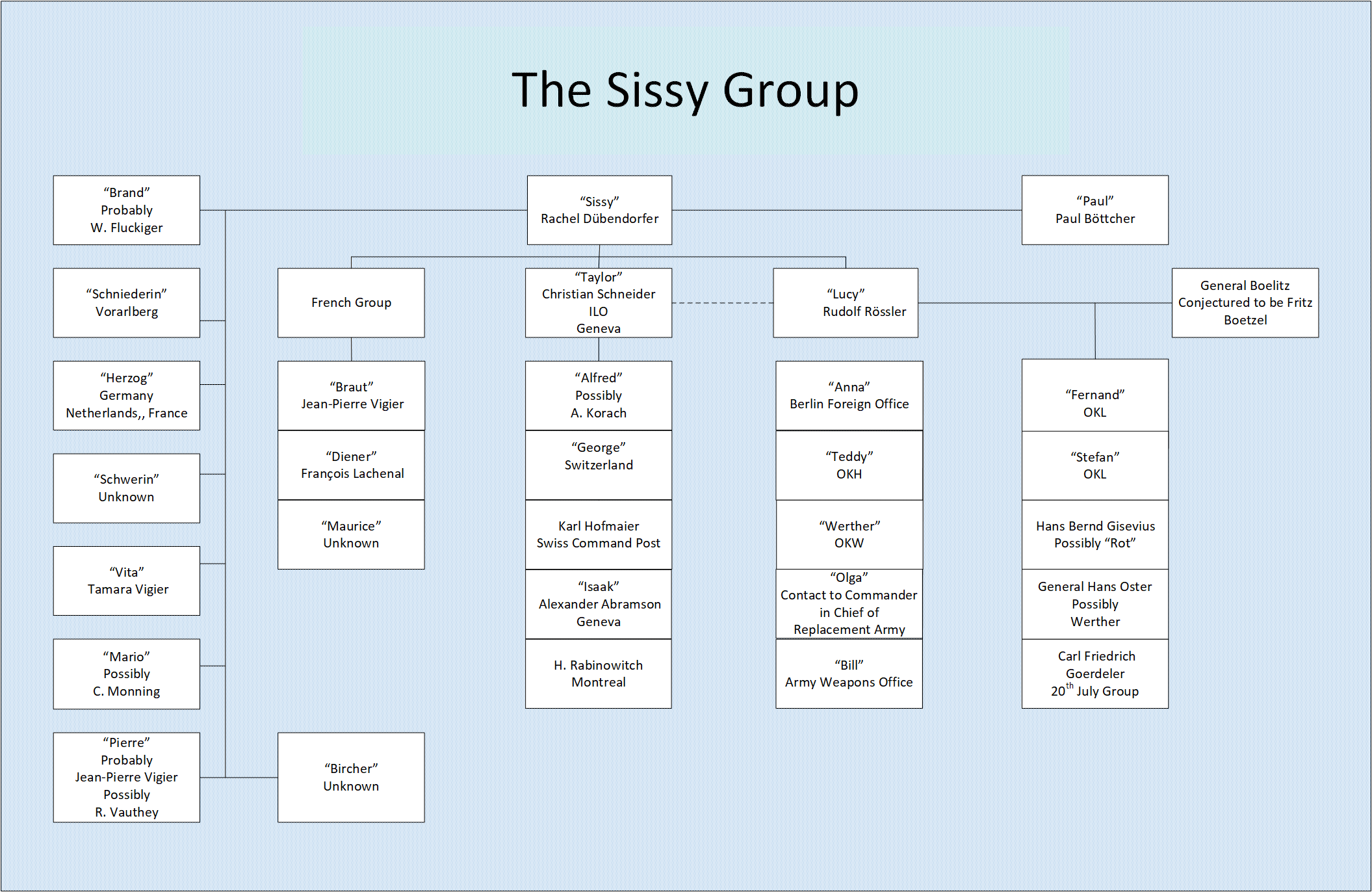
Roessler was part of the Sissy group, that was run by Rachel Dübendorfer. Although Roessler is contained in the hierarchy diagram, he never met Dübendorfer directly. Instead documents were given to Christian Schneider who couriered them from Lucerne to Geneva on a daily basis, to deliver them to Dübendorfer, who then brought them to Radó

Another recipient of Roessler's messages and analyses was Soviet military intelligence-agent Alexander Radó, who ran a Soviet espionage network in Switzerland that was section of the so-called Red Orchestra. In Germany it was known as the Rote Drei.

Roessler was recruited into the espionage network by Soviet agents Paul Böttcher (politician) and Rachel Dübendorfer via Christian Schneider (editor). Schneider, an economist, became an editor at the Gladbecker Zeitung newspaper after completing his studies. In 1926, he was selected from 230 applicants as a translator at the International Labour Organization (ILO) in Geneva. He remained there until the end of his employment in 1939, when the ILO laid off staff because its importance had declined, resulting in Schneider becoming unemployed. At the same time, Roessler placed an advertisement in the Neue Zürcher Zeitung looking for a publisher who could also work in French-speaking Switzerland and on 17 July 1939 Schneider was hired. Schneider began to set up a branch of the publishing house in Geneva. Roessler and Schneider had similar political views and got on well, which resulted in Roessler telling Schneider of the reports he was receiving.

Schneider was friends with Dübendorfer (who also worked at the ILO), and her partner Paul Böttcher. Böttcher was a communist and former finance minister of Saxony and lived in Switzerland under the name Dübendorfer. Like Roessler, whom he did not know personally, Böttcher provided Radó with intelligence. At a dinner together around June 1941, Schneider showed Böttcher one of Roessler's reports.

About a year later, Böttcher told Schneider that a report by Roessler would be of great strategic interest to Soviet intelligence and asked Schneider if Roessler would be prepared to pass the intelligence to him on a regular basis. Roessler agreed and from the summer of 1942 to 1944 gave Schneider the typed sheets, who couriered them to Dübendorfer. Schneider received no payment from either of the recipients for his transmission services, only reimbursement for the costs of the railroad.

=== The role of Karel Sedláček ===
In June 1937, Karel Sedláček, a German speaking Czech intelligence officer, worked undercover as Karl Seltzinger in Zurich as correspondent for the Prague-based newspaper Národní listy. By the autumn of 1938, Sedlacek was friends with Hans Hausamann and receiving intelligence reports from him. In the spring of 1939, Sedláček moved to Lucerne where he met Roessler and through their common journalistic background, cultivated him. In September 1939, Sedláček began transmitting intelligence to František Moravec of the Czechoslovak government-in-exile in London and continued over a period of three years.

=== Battle of Kursk and Operation Citadel ===
In early March 1943, Hitler planned a massive offensive against the Kursk salient known as Operation Citadel in the hope of regaining the initiative in the east. On 15 April 1943, Hitler signed Order Number 6 to begin the offensive. Within 24 hours Alexander Foote had informed Soviet intelligence. On the 3 April 1943, a message stated: The Wehrmacht's attack on Kursk is to be postponed until the beginning of May 1943 because increasingly stronger Soviet forces are being massed on the northern sector of the front, especially in Velikiye Luki. This report was true because Order No. 6 of the OKH ordered May 3 as the earliest date of attack. On 20 April 1943 a message stated the attack on Kursk is postponed to 12 June 1943. This order was not signed until 29 April 1943. The attack was later postponed again and began on 5 July 1943.

In at least almost 70 cases, Sándor Radó forwarded significant messages from Roessler to Soviet intelligence. Roessler's intelligence wasn't only strategic in nature; he also supplied the Soviets with detailed information on the new German Panther tank.

=== Remuneration ===
Roessler was particularly mercenary in his approach. At the beginning of 1942, Roessler complained to Bernhard Mayr von Baldegg, who was an officer in the Swiss general staff at the time, staff officer to Max Waibel, in command of Noehrichtenstelle I (Note: Noehrichtenstelle I was a Swiss radio intercept station) of the 5th Signals in Lucerne, that he found the work for Hausamann boring. Waibel decided to keep him interested by paying him 250 Swiss francs per month, which later increased to 400 francs as the war progressed. Büro Ha also paid him 1000 francs per month which was raised to 2000 francs per month as the war progressed. Roessler was also paid by Soviet intelligence, initially receiving 700 Swiss francs per month, increasing to 3000 francs per month as the war progressed. The following are some examples of captured radio messages that detail Roessler's mercenary nature:

- 12.3.1943 . . . Agree to buy Plan Ostwall for 5000 francs. Does Lucy know whether these documents are genuine and reliable?
- 10. and 11.11.1943 . . . Sissy states that Lucy group no longer works when the salary stops.
- 14.11.1943 . . . Please tell Lucy in our name that ... his group will surely be paid according to his demands. We are ready to reward him richly for his information.
- 9.12.1943 ... Inform Lucy not to worry about the money situation.

=== Roessler's Sources in World War II ===
The record of messages transmitted show that Roessler had four important sources. It was never discovered who they were. The four sources whose codenames were Werther, Teddy, Olga, and Anna were responsible for 42.5 percent of the intelligence sent from Switzerland to the Soviet Union.

The search for the identity of those sources has created a very large body of work of varying quality and offering various conclusions. Several theories can be dismissed immediately, including by Foote and several other writers, that the code names reflected the sources' access type rather than their identity- for example, that Werther stood for Wehrmacht, Olga for Oberkommando der Luftwaffe, Anna for Auswärtiges Amt (Foreign Office)- as the evidence does not support it. Alexander Radó made this claim in his memoirs, that were examined in a Der Spiegel article that comprehensively debunked the claim as false. Three and a half years before his death, Roessler described the identity of the four sources to a confidant. They were a German major who was in charge of the Abwehr before Wilhelm Canaris, Hans Bernd Gisevius, Carl Goerdeler and a General Boelitz, who was then deceased.

The most reliable study by the CIA Historical Review Program concluded that of the four sources, the most important source was Werther. The study stated he was likely Wehrmacht General Hans Oster, other Abwehr officers working with Swiss intelligence, or Swiss intelligence on its own. There was no evidence to link the other three codenames to known individuals. The CIA believed that the German sources gave their reports to Swiss General Staff, who in turn supplied Roessler with information that the Swiss wanted to pass to the Soviets.

=== Transmission channels ===
There are least two theories on how Roessler received his reports in Switzerland.

In the first earlier theory, Roessler received his reports via radio transmission that were encrypted with the Enigma rotor cipher machine. This theory is supported by Jörgensen, Accoce, Quet, along with Tarrant In Berlin, Roessler was a member of the Herren Klub, a prestigious gentleman's club, where he met senior officers from the German military, many who would later become his contacts within Germany and assist with the disclosure of classified information. On 30 May 1938 in Lucerne, Roessler was visited by two of his contacts, the German generals Fritz Thiele and Rudolf Christoph Freiherr von Gersdorff, who would eventually become the officer in charge of the intelligence department of Army Group Centre in the Eastern Front. Roessler was provided with an Enigma machine and the latest shortwave transmitter and told to start listening for messages from Thiele who was stationed in the Bendlerblock. The messages were sent using the call-sign RAHS. A typical day for Roessler was to receive transmissions via the Broadcasting Center during his work day, and rebroadcast that information to the Russian military after leaving work for the evening. In this theory, Roessler was trained by Schneider on how to use the Enigma and the radio transmitter. This thesis was comprehensively contradicted by Der Spiegel magazine on 15 January 1967 article "Verräter im Führerhauptquartier".

The second newer and simpler theory is described by Kamber who believes that the messages from Roessler's sources from the German Reich were sent via telephone and telex lines to the Milan reporting center. From there, they were forwarded to Switzerland by a courier. These were documents that arrived at Lucerne railroad station via the Chiasso border station by Swiss Post mail train at 11:30 in the evening. Roessler collected them there almost daily. Stöckli who was friends with Roessler from when he first moved to Lucerne, had told two authors, Lutz Mahlerwein and Adalbert Wiemer of a historical TV programme "Dora an Direktor: der Angriff steht bevor" on 18 July 1989, that the reports had come by postal train to Milan. The TV programme details had been recorded by the Stasi and archived.

=== End of operations ===
On 12 December 1941, the Abwehr discovered Leopold Trepper's espionage network in Belgium and gave it the moniker "Rote Kapelle". On 9 November 1942, Anatoly Gurevich was arrested and during interogration he exposed the existence of the Swiss network to the Abwehr. Hans Peter, the lover of Margrit Bolli was actually a German agent, and according to one source stole an unencrypted message that had been left in Bolli's apartment when she moved apartment, as early as 16 March 1943 and passed it to German intelligence, who used it to decrypt Rote Drei radio communications.

In the summer of 1943, Heinz Pannwitz of the Sonderkommando Rote Kapelle despatched the German Jew Ewald Zweig with the cover name Yves Rameau to Switzerland with the intention of penetrating Radó's network. (Note: Zweig was a penetration agent, known in Germany as a V-Mann that was short for Vertrauens-mann. (German:V-Mann, plural V-Leute) They were generally prisoners who agreed to work as undercover agents on pain of death, should they have refused.) Zweig passed on details of what he learned about the network to the Swiss Federal Police.

Swiss defensive neutrality was important to the Swiss people, particularly in foreign policy that had passed from a political doctrine to tradition and had existed for centuries. There were also genuine fears that Switzerland would have been encircled after the Italian armistice. When the Swiss were informed of the existence of the network, they immediately began searching for it on 9 September 1943. On 11 September 1943, a Swiss Army radio counterintelligence company notified the Federal Police that radio signals from the Geneva area could be detected, which resulted in the arrest of radio operator Margrit Bolli along with Edmond and Olga Hamel on the night 13 October 1943.

=== Wartime arrest ===
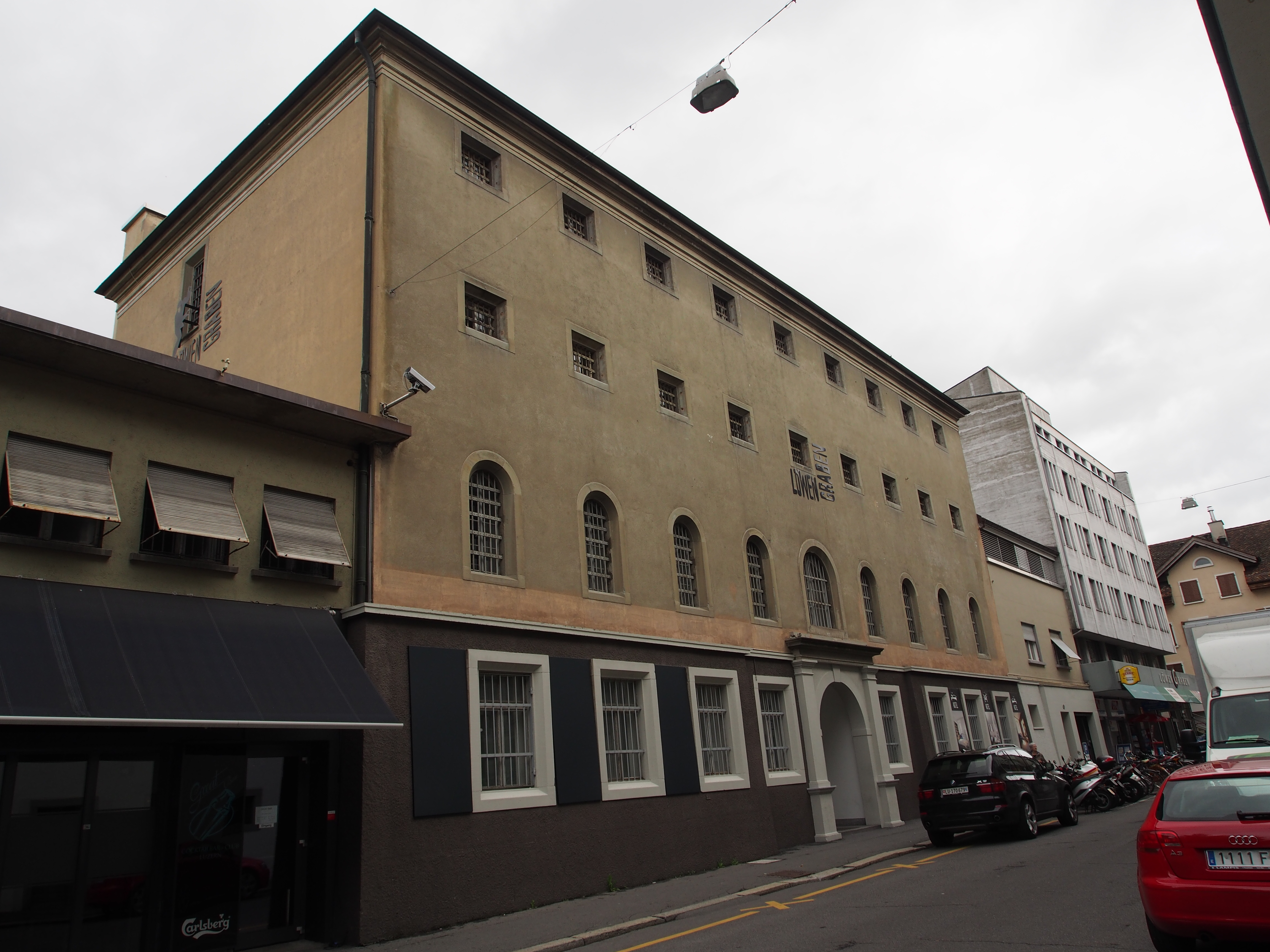
Roessler spent 111 days in Löwengraben prison

After Hamel and Bolli were arrested, Roessler feared that he would also be investigated and that his informants in the German Reich would be endangered. He asked Mayr von Baldegg, the deputy head of Noehrichtenstelle I, to intervene on behalf of Hamel and Christian Schneider. Mayr von Baldegg presented the request to the head of the intelligence office, but left it at that. Until the arrest of Dübendorfer and Böttcher, the federal police were not aware of Roessler's reports. Radó suspected that Christian Schneider told the federal police that the reports came from Roessler. On 19 May 1944, the federal police arrested Roessler, the cutout Schneider, the courier Tamara Vigier and Mayr von Baldegg. This ended Roessler's intelligence activities not only for Soviet intelligence, but also for the Büro Ha and the Swiss General Staff.

Roger Masson, head of the intelligence section of the Swiss army staff, was not interested in the intelligence activities of their informant Roessler becoming known to a wider group of people. He could have tried to have the investigation closed. However, he decided not do this. Instead he sent Roessler to prison for his own safety, as Masson feared that the German Sicherheitsdienst would attempt to kidnap Roessler.

On 6 September 1944, Roessler was released from prison. The main hearing against him and Schneider in the criminal case took place after the end of the war, in 22–23 October 1945, before a military court. Noehrichtenstelle I placed one of its officers as a defense attorney. The division court considered it criminal that Roessler and Schneider also passed on information in reports to Soviet intelligence that the Swiss authorities had determined through interrogations of deserters. The divisional court found Roessler and Schneider guilty, but nevertheless refrained from imposing a penalty because both had rendered great service to Switzerland. Roessler did not reveal the names of his German and Swiss informants either in the preliminary investigation or in the main proceedings On 22–23 October 1945, the Swiss military court sentenced each to two years.

=== Summary ===
During his spy career, Roessler provided intelligence to the Soviet Union, Czechoslovakia, Switzerland and the United Kingdom, at the minimum. He was often able to deliver accurate intelligence within one day of the orders being issued. For instance, a German army commander found a copy of his own orders in the Red Army headquarters building in the Polish town of Łomża when his unit occupied it after wresting it from the Russians. This was reported to the German high command, yet they were unable to find the leak.

== After World War II ==
=== Cold War ===
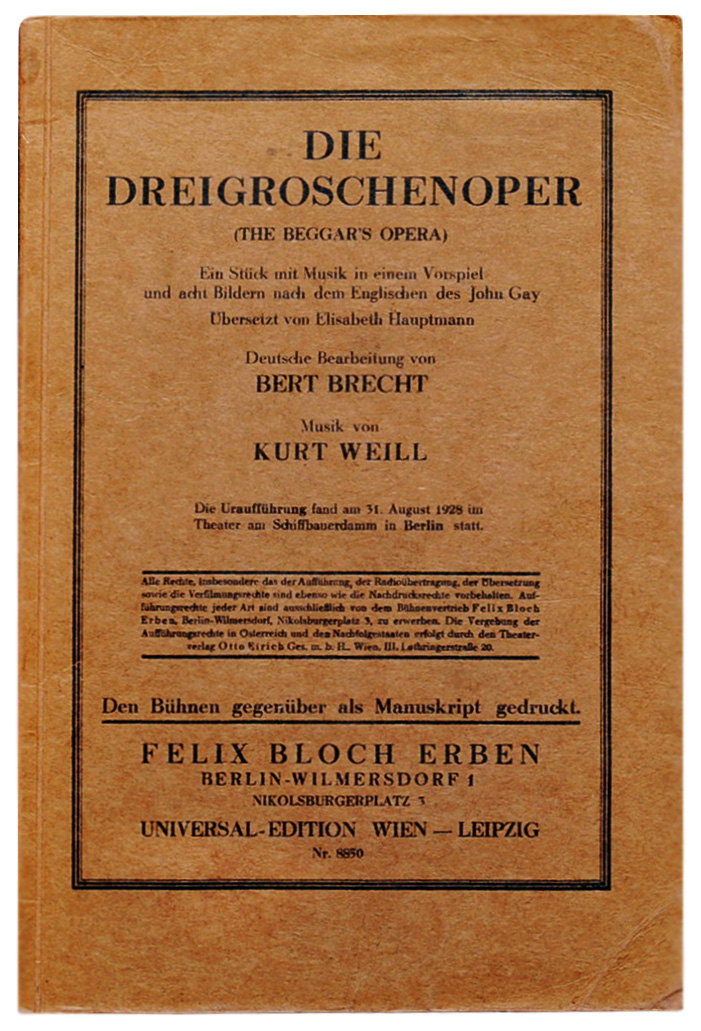
A period copy of Bertolt Brecht's Die Dreigroschenoper (The Threepenny Opera), music by Kurt Weill, performed in Berlin in 1928, burnt in the public square on 10 May 1933. Brecht, who was a year ahead of Roessler in school, had left Germany three months earlier, like many other left-wing intellectuals.

In 1945, shortly after the end of the war, Karel Sedláček, who had regular contact with Hans Hausamann and was now the Czechoslovak Military Attaché in Bern, visited Xaver Schnieper, whom he knew and who was a friend of Roessler. In 1947, Sedláček who then held the rank of lieutenant colonel, introduced his successor Kopačka and his secretary, Captain Volf to Schnieper to Roessler. Volf arranged with Schnieper to request Roessler to reactivate his wartime Rote Kapelle spy ring. Sedlacek knew Schnieper well and he also knew that both Schnieper and Roessler as freelance journalists would be struggling to make ends meet. Roessler, by virtue of his wartime reputation, was given a sweeping brief. He was told to report all military and air force matters in Western Europe, the U.K., and Spain under Franco, and in particular to concentrate on infiltrating the United States military and report on intelligence operations in Western Europe. Roessler agreed and provided the requested reports. Schnieper wrote the reports up on his typewriter and handed it to Volf. Roessler received 500 to 1,000 francs per bundle. On 25 February 1948, after the Czechoslovak coup d'état, contact between Volf and Roessler broke off.

There was no contact between Czech intelligence and Roessler until July 1950 when a contact "Konrad" approached Schnieper and asked him to reactivate the operation and send future reports on microfilm to two Prague addresses. He was paid a signing bonus of 3,000 francs. Roessler and Schnieper received almost 50,000 francs for the work. Roessler developed his reports largely from newspaper clippings and other previously published material. He collected, compared and checked the news for contradictions and placed them in a larger context.

Between 10 and 21 June and 7–27 September 1952, Roessler visited Germany and obtained information about the US Army stationed there. The renewed intelligence activity was noticed when a package sent to Germany on 3 January 1953 was returned. Customs opened it and found a honey jar with a capsule that contained microfilm. When the microfilm was examined, it was found to contain news about the airfields and the headquarters of the British Royal Air Force, about the rebuilding of the West German aviation industry, about U.S. bases, the German Air Force in Jutland and the operational strength of the French Army.

=== Arrest ===
On 9 March 1953, Roessler was arrested. During the investigation, Roessler testified that he had to secure his livelihood as his publishing company, Vita Nova Verlag was no longer profitable. Business remained satisfactory until 1948 because the publisher was able to sell existing books after the end of the war. However, after 1948, sales declined. Roessler trial was held on 2 November 1953, where he was charged with spying on West Germany for Communist Czechoslovakia. He was sentenced to twenty-one months in prison, minus the time he spent in detention awaiting the trial. Roessler was imprisoned for 12 months and released in early 1954. Xaver Schnieper who was charged with Roessler, was imprisoned for nine months in prison.

=== Freelance journalist ===
After he was released from jail, Roessler spent his last years living quietly in Kriens. He continued to write. His articles, which were unsigned, appeared in the Lucerne daily newspaper of the Social Democratic Party of Switzerland, Freie Innerschweiz.

Roessler continued to argue against West German rearmament and for international solidarity. The articles can be split into two categories. The first category was short articles of one to two pages, that focused on a part of a larger topic. The second and more important were articles on specific areas of interest, that ran to four or five pages and covered subjects within economic, social, colonial and security policy. These bigger articles often contained a number of abbreviations that were subject to change, so it was not possible for the reader to determine who the author was. Roessler was disillusioned with the Cold War, particularly after his trial, particularly when he was accused of spying in favour of the Soviet Union. Therefore, his work at the newspaper was not formally recognised. Even his obituary failed to mention his work there.

Roessler was not a Social Democrat, so it was difficult to determine how his political analysis was affected by his articles being published in a social-democratic daily newspaper, as other sources on his life, politics and cultural outlook have so far been lacking. In a telephone call to the Freie Innerschweiz on 29 May 1991, his friend, Xaver Schnieper confirmed that Roessler would certainly not have written anything that contradicted his own opinion.

Roessler was committed to the socially disadvantaged, combined with a criticism of the idea that technology and armament were the only way to a better world. He had aversion to the hysteria of the Cold War and its associated militarism that made him appear more left-wing today than many social democrats at the time.

=== Missing honours ===
In 1967, the leadership of Soviet military intelligence proposed that Roessler, along with other Soviet military intelligence informants, be honoured posthumously with an award. But the GDR Minister for State Security, Erich Mielke, a Marxist, objected and the plan was abandoned. The possible motive was that Roessler rejected dialectical and historical materialism.

== Analysis ==
There are a number of sources that claim that the Rote Drei was functioning before the war and that Roessler, as Lucy, sent information to the Soviets that provided advanced warning of Hitler's impending attack on Russia. However, an examination of the radio messages that were transmitted by the group, proves that Rachel Dübendorfer did not form a clandestine relationship with Roessler until the late summer of 1942.

Roessler's value to the Rote Drei and the Soviets derived entirely from his sources in Germany. This context is probably misleading, as the CIA believed that the German sources gave their intelligence to Swiss General Staff, who in turn supplied Roessler with information that the Swiss wanted to pass to the Soviets.

== Publications ==
- Roessler, Rudolf (1941). Die Kriegsschauplätze und die Bedingungen der Kriegführung (in German). Lucerne: Vita-Nova Verlag. OCLC 71984810.

== See also ==
- Vita Nova Swiss publishing house created by Roessler
