= Rachel Dübendorfer =

Anti-Nazi resistance fighter

- Image of Rachel Dübendorfer taken on 21 April 1944
- Born: Rachel Hepner; 18 July 1900; Warsaw, Poland
- Died: 3 March 1973 (aged 72); East Berlin, East Germany
- Spouse(s): Kurt Caspary; Henri Dübendorfer; Paul Böttcher
- Parent: Adolf Hepner (father)
- Espionage activity
- Service branch: Red Three
- Service years: 1942–1945
- Codename: Sissy

Rachel Dübendorfer (née Hepner; 18 July 1900 – 3 March 1973) was an anti-Nazi resistance fighter. During the Second World War, her codename was Sissy, and she was in a section of the Red Three Swiss resistance movement.

== Personal life ==
Dübendorfer was born in Warsaw, Poland in 1900. She was the daughter of Adolf Hepner, and was Jewish. She moved to Germany in the 1920s and moved to Nürensdorf, Switzerland in 1933. She was married twice: first to German lawyer Kurt Caspary around 1921, then to Swissman Henri Dübendorfer, which allowed her to gain Swiss citizenship, in 1934. This marriage ended in divorce in 1946. She became the lover of Paul Böttcher. She died in 1973 in East Berlin, East Germany.

== Career ==
In 1918, Dübendorfer joined the Communist Party of Germany. In 1927, she joined the Soviet Main Intelligence Directorate (GRU), where she worked alongside Paul Böttcher. At the start of the Second World War, she worked as a secretary at the League of Nations International Labour Organization and also led a group of Swiss communist informants in Geneva, Switzerland. Dübendorfer began receiving sensitive information from sources in the organisation. She received intelligence reports from German refugee Rudolf Roessler (nicknamed Lucy) in return for not revealing his identity. Their operation was known as the Lucy spy ring.

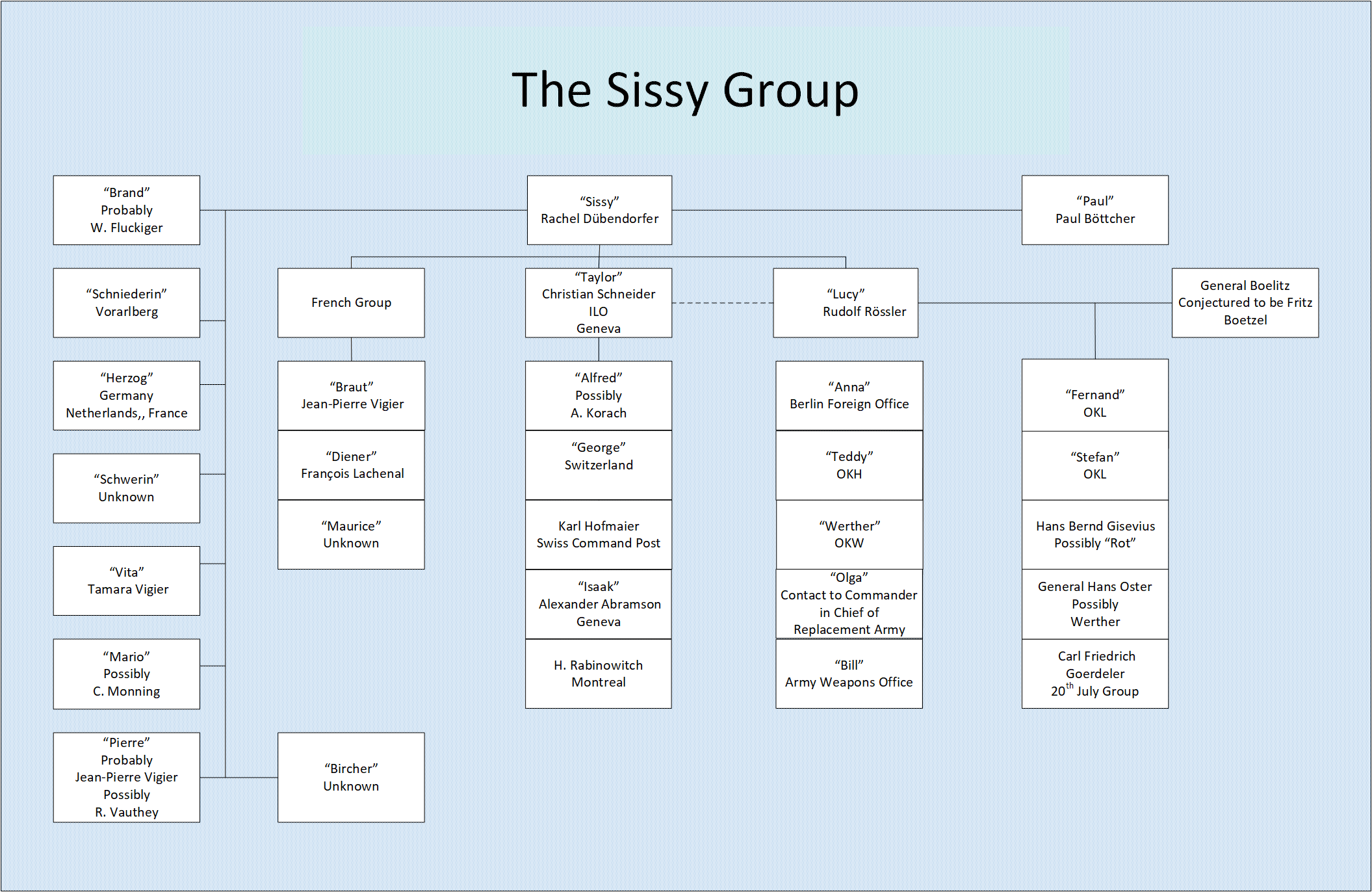
The organisation of the Sissy network

In May 1941, Dübendorfer met Alexander Radó for the first time. In 1942, she was in a section of Rado's Red Three resistance movement. Others in the movement included Georges Blun and Otto Pünter. In 1942, Dübendorfer received German military information about the planned Case Blue invasion of the Soviet Union (USSR), which was eventually transmitted to the Soviet Union.

Initially, Dübendorfer did not mention to Radó the name of Roessler, her most important informant. In November 1943, Dübendorfer became the lone Red Three member after leaders, including Radó, were arrested and imprisoned. Dübendorfer tried unsuccessfully to contact Moscow through Hermina Rabinovitch, a friend who lived in Montreal, Canada.

Afterward, Dübendorfer refused to co-operate with Soviet leader Joseph Stalin and did not want to send information back to Moscow. She provided information to MI6 officers in Switzerland, under the proviso that this information was not shared with Moscow. In April 1944, Dübendorfer and Böttcher were captured. She was imprisoned in the USSR and later East Germany from 1946 until 1956 and so she never became a leader.
