= Vita Nova =

Swiss publishing house

Vita Nova (meaning New Life in Latin) was a Swiss publishing house at 36 Fluhmattstrasse in Lucerne, Switzerland, that was established in January 1934 and co-founded by Rudolf Roessler along with the Catholic bookseller Josef Stocker and the financier Henriette Racine. It was run by the journalist and theater critic Rudolf Roessler.

== Beginnings ==
Stocker had been encouraged to help co-found the publishing firm by the Jesuit theologian Otto Karrer.

== Books published ==
Vita Nova was an anti-Nazi publishing house that primarily published German writers living in exile. It published some fifty brochures and books critical of both Nazism and Stalinism; writers often based their arguments on Christian values. In 1935, the publishing house published Die Gefährdung des Christentums durch Rassenwahn und Judenverfolgung (The Endangerment of Christianity through Racial Theories and the Persecution of the Jews), in which recognized Catholic and Protestant leaders comment on the connections between National Socialist racial doctrine and anti-Semitism. Among the personalities who contributed essays were the Anglican cleric William Ralph Inge (London), the Czech philosopher Emanuel Rádl (Prague), Johann Alois Scheiwiler (Bishop of St. Gallen), and the Norwegian novelist Sigrid Undset. Nicolas Berdyaev published a German translation of The Worth of Christianity and the Unworthiness of Christians with Vita Nova in 1936. The small firm also published books that were critical of Francoist Spain.

== Memorandum ==
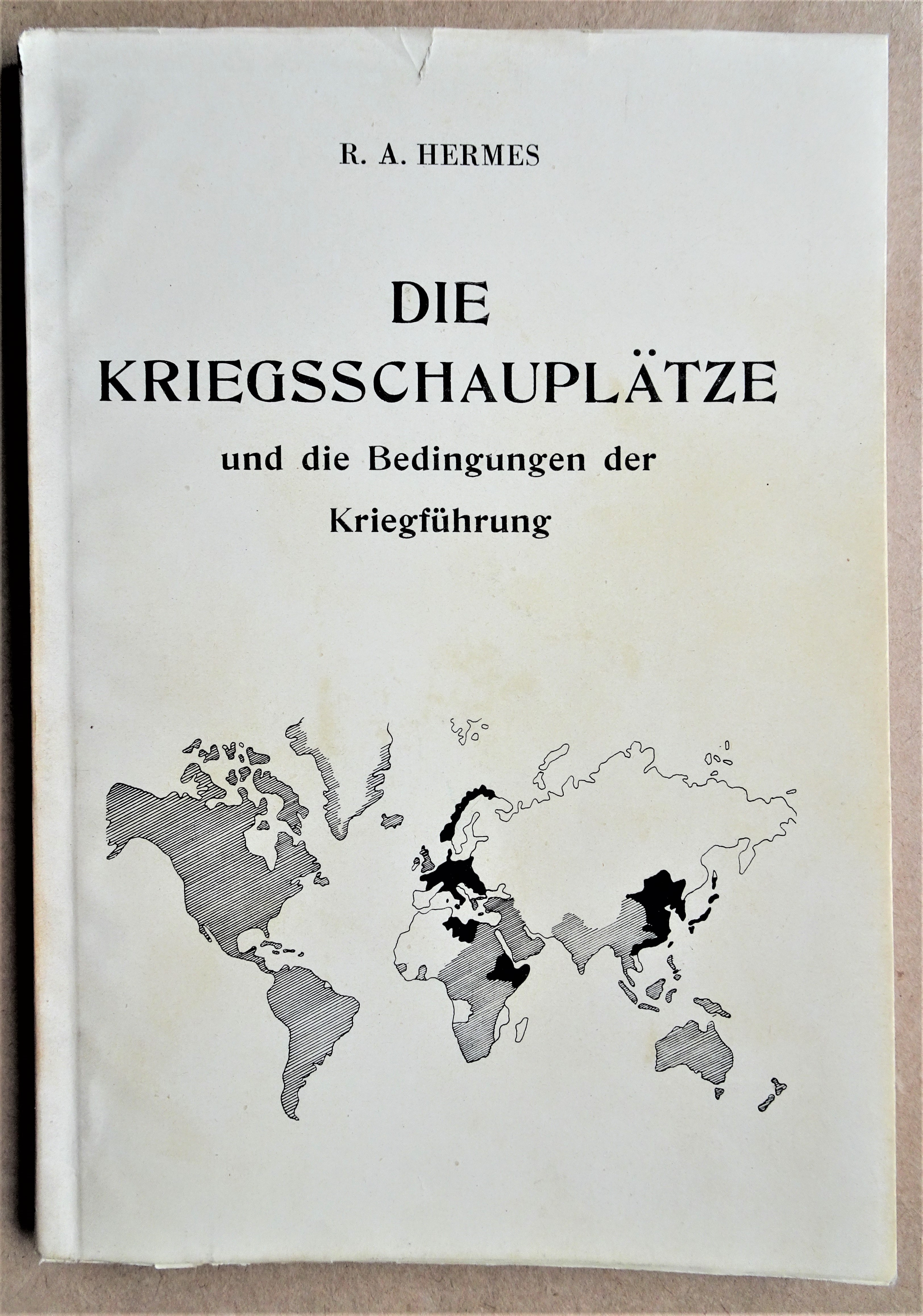
Memorandum on the future course of the war

From 1940 to 1941, Roessler wrote a 94-page memorandum under the pseudonym R. A. Hermes that Vita Nova published, Die Kriegsschauplätze und die Bedingungen der Kriegführung (Memorandum on the war situation after the Battle of Britain). Although the German Reich had not yet invaded the Soviet Union, Roessler predicted that it would have a difficult time in the further course of the war. Great Britain and the United States of America, which was not yet at war, controlled the major passages on the world's oceans and the Axis powers Germany and Italy would first have to acquire this position before the war could be won on their side. Territorial gains could contribute to the success of the war, but also to its failure.

The decisive factor was whether the acquirer had to dominate the territory by force and the associated effort, or whether he could retain enough partisans in the occupied country. The German Reich lacked this throughout, especially in relation to Poland and the Soviet Union. From the outset, these campaigns were designed to be a war of annihilation between two races and two world views. Winning over partisans was neither possible nor intended.
