= Alexander Foote =

British spy (1905–1957)

- Image of Foote, while he was in the International Brigade
- Born: 13 April 1905; Liverpool
- Died: 1 August 1956 (aged 51)
- Occupation: Radio operator
- Known for: Spy for the Soviet Union
- Movement: International Brigades (1936–1938)

Alexander Allan Foote (13 April 1905 – 1 August 1956) was a radio operator for a Soviet espionage ring in Switzerland during World War II. Foote was born in Liverpool and raised mostly in Yorkshire by his Scottish-born father and English mother.

== Life ==
Foote completed his education at sixteen and, after working in different professions, joined the Royal Air Force in 1935. However, he deserted while serving at Gosport Barracks on 23 December 1936.

Following his desertion he sailed for Spain and served with the British Battalion of the International Brigades during the Spanish Civil War for two years.

Serving with the rank of Sergeant, Foote was appointed transport officer and batman to Fred Copeman.

He decided to continue his efforts against Fascism (and, perhaps, for Communism) and volunteered for clandestine work with Red Orchestra. He was put into contact with Ursula Kuczynski in Switzerland. He became a radio operator for the Soviet espionage operation run by Alexander Radó and was one of those who passed information to Moscow from the Lucy spy ring run by Rudolf Roessler. Foote was one of those arrested when the Swiss police shut down most of the operation and was detained for a time.

After the War, he spent some time in the Eastern Bloc and then returned to the West and published his book, A Handbook for Spies. He died in 1956.

== Espionage ==
Because of the implausible veracity of the intelligence (fast, plentiful, and accurate) and never explained source of the Lucy Ring's information, suspicion attaches to all those associated with it. Since Foote, as the Lucy Ring's radio operator, was a central cog in the chain of supply and therefore in a position to know much, his subsequent account has been thought to be rather dubious in places. This, and the fact that he seemingly managed to return to the West rather easily, has led some to suggest Foote was a British Secret Service double agent and one conduit (perhaps even the main one) of intelligence from Britain to Roessler and thence to Moscow.

According to various sources, Foote was indeed a MI6 (SIS) double agent unbeknownst to Radó. After the destruction of Radó's network and his escape from Switzerland, Radó met Foote in Paris and both were ordered to return to Moscow immediately. They took off aboard a Russian military aeroplane on 6 January 1945, taking a circuitous route (the war being still in progress) via Egypt. Their plane landed to refuel in Cairo, whereupon Radó defected. Continuing alone to Moscow, Foote was subjected to intensive interrogation in an attempt to determine his loyalty and the possibility of his being a penetration agent. Foote was confronted with an instance of disinformation sent from his transmitter in May 1942 and told "That message cost us 100 000 men at Kharkov and resulted in the Germans reaching Stalingrad". Foote said that he merely passed on what he received from Radó. Satisfied with Foote's explanation, the Soviets gave Foote a false identity under the alias of Major Granatov. Posing as a German, Albert Müller, he inserted himself into postwar Berlin to establish this alias with the aim of being sent by the Moscow Centre to Argentina, to attempt to identify and infiltrate groups of escaped high-ranking Nazis.

Journalist, broadcaster and author Malcolm Muggeridge, himself a wartime MI6 officer, "got to know Foote after the war" (pp 207–08) when Foote paid Muggeridge "regular visits" at his flat near Regent's Park, London. Foote at this time was working as a clerk in the Ministry of Agriculture and Fisheries, work he found, according to Muggeridge, "very tedious". Muggeridge is firmly of the opinion that the information Foote sent "could only, in fact, have come from Bletchley".

In March 1947, following the defection of a Soviet agent who had been involved with British Intelligence, Foote's allegiance to the British may have been confirmed. Foote himself defected from his Russian control in Berlin, escaping to the British sector.

== See also ==
- Mitrokhin Archive
