= Jan Marsalek =

Austrian fugitive businessman (born 1980)

- Born: Jan Maršálek; 15 March 1980 (age 46); Vienna, Austria
- Citizenship: Uncertain, likely Russia (2020–present); Austria
- Occupation: Business executive
- Organization: Wirecard
- Known for: Wirecard scandal Russian spy scandal (2018–present)
- Relatives: Hans Maršálek (grandfather)
- Capture status: Fugitive
- Wanted by: Federal Criminal Police Office
- Wanted since: 5 August 2020

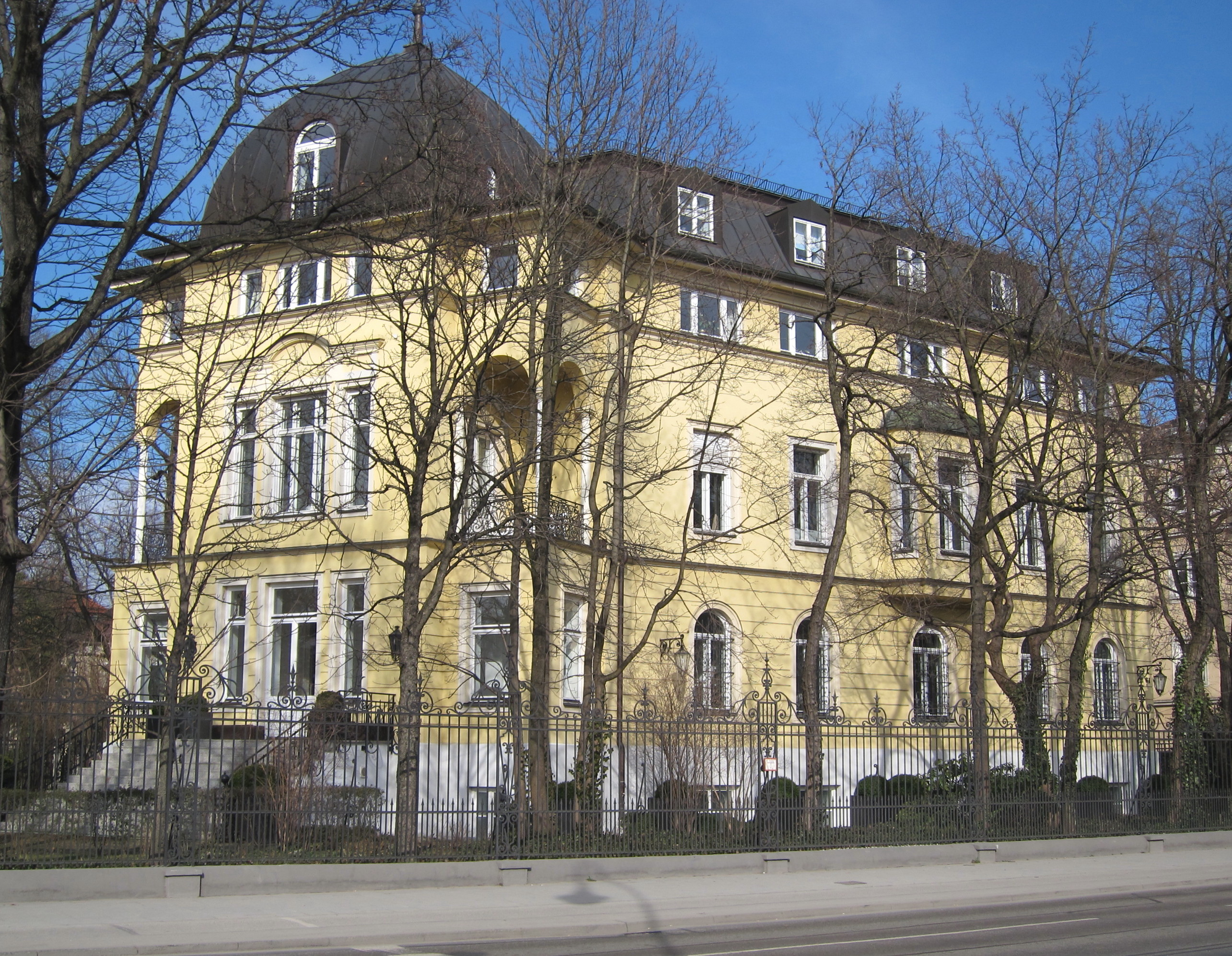
Former residence of Jan Marsalek at Prinzregentenstraße 61 in Munich.

Jan Marsalek (né Maršálek, 15 March 1980, recent false identity Alexander Mikhailovich Nelidov) is an Austrian fugitive former businessman and suspected spy operative for Russia. From 2010 to 2020, he was chief operating officer of the German payment processing firm Wirecard, which became insolvent and collapsed in 2020. Marsalek was responsible for Wirecard's business in Asia, where the company admitted that nearly €2 billion in cash it supposedly held did not exist.

Marsalek and the rest of the company's executive team were dismissed on 18 June 2020, after which he fled Germany. He is now reportedly living in Russia after Interpol issued a "red notice" arrest warrant for his alleged role in the Wirecard scandal. According to investigators, Marsalek had been recruited by Russian intelligence since at least 2010.

== Early life ==
Marsalek attended high school in Austria but dropped out without obtaining a diploma. Marsalek's grandfather, Hans Maršálek, was a member of the Austrian resistance during World War II and was later suspected to be a spy for the Soviet Union. At the age of 19, Jan Marsalek founded an e-commerce software company.

== Career with Wirecard ==
Marsalek began working for Wirecard in 2000, initially hired for his knowledge on WAP systems. On 1 February 2010, he became the firm's chief operating officer and also joined the company's executive committee.

=== Wirecard scandal ===
Marsalek and the rest of Wirecard's executive team were terminated on 18 June 2020. According to Bellingcat, an investigative journalism website, Marsalek claimed to colleagues he was going to the Philippines to prove his innocence. Soon afterward, he was reported missing. Marsalek is considered a key suspect by German authorities in the Wirecard scandal, in which the company inflated its balance sheet, eventually leading to the company's collapse in 2020.

Marsalek's last known residence was in Munich. An investigation by Bellingcat, Der Spiegel and The Insider indicated that he fled to Minsk, Belarus, just hours after he was fired from Wirecard. On 19 July 2020, the German newspaper Handelsblatt reported that Marsalek was probably in Russia, where he was believed to live under the supervision of the Russian GRU in a mansion near Moscow. According to Die Welt, the BND had information in 2020 that Marsalek was at a Russian FSB training center in Balashikha, a suburb of Moscow.

At the request of Germany, Interpol issued a red notice for Marsalek in August 2020. The notice was a formal request to law enforcement worldwide to locate and arrest him, pending extradition.

=== Life in Russia ===
In May 2021, the German BND assessed that Marsalek remained living near Moscow. The Russian government claimed it was unaware of his whereabouts. According to Mikhail Khodorkovsky's Dossier Center, Marsalek had received Russian citizenship and possessed at least two fake Russian passports in 2021. He reportedly lived under FSB protection at the Meyendorff Castle.

In September 2025, through the cooperation of Der Spiegel (Germany), ZDF (Germany), Standard (Austria), PBS-Frontline (USA), and The Insider (Latvia) detailed information about Marsalek's life and activities in Russia was successfully obtained.

Marsalek was regularly accompanied by the translator Tatiana Spiridonova (born 1984). Marsalek learned Russian from her. According to reports, she is also considered a close contact person with ties to state institutions in Moscow. She took over courier services: In June 2022, she brought smartphones procured in Vienna to Moscow via Istanbul. Chat logs document the handover to Spiridonova and her quick return journey.

On December 13, 2022, Spiridonova also picked up a laptop with NATO-compliant encryption ("SINA") in Istanbul and brought it to Moscow that same night. In a chat, Marsalek wrote that the device was "in a car on the way to Lubyanka". The action is consistent with previous reports that Marsalek is said to have supplied Russia with sensitive computing hardware.

His commute to the headquarters of the Russian domestic intelligence agency FSB in Moscow is also documented. According to the research, Marsalek has used several false identities and, since 2025, a real Russian passport. According to the report, Marsalek was allegedly born on February 22, 1978, in Soviet Riga; his new alias is Alexander Mikhailovich Nelidov.

Data analyses also document travel by Marsalek to the war zone in eastern Ukraine and to Russian-occupied Mariupol. According to informants in Moscow, he is said to have participated in operations behind the front lines there. Passport entries and travel data show that he visited Russian-occupied Crimea several times.

== Ties to Russian intelligence ==
Marsalek became a person of interest in 2020 for at least three Western intelligence agencies due to his associations with the Russian GRU. In Munich, Marsalek had lived opposite the Russian consulate. Russian media and Germany's governing coalition reported that Marsalek made contacts with Russian intelligence through the Austrian-Russian Friendship Society. Among his associates was former GRU colonel Andrey Chuprygin. Marsalek reportedly boasted to companions about his trips to Palmyra, Syria, as a "guest of the Russian military".

Since 2015, Marsalek had reportedly discussed the Libyan crisis with representatives of the Russian government. A company linked to Marsalek by the Financial Times was used by the Wagner Group, Russian state-sponsored mercenaries, to stage personnel.

A 2023 investigation concluded that Marsalek had been recruited as a Russian intelligence agent for at least a decade. An investigation by German, Austrian and Russian journalists also revealed that in 2020 Russian special services had assigned Marsalek the fake identity of Konstantin Bajazow, an Orthodox priest. Marsalek was issued a Russian passport with this identity, one originally belonging to an actual Orthodox priest from Lipetsk who physically resembles Marsalek. A key role was also played by Natalia Zlobina, who became Marsalek's partner. It was suggested that she may have been recruited as a "honey trap", as she had casually met Marsalek and by 2014 had introduced him to GRU handler Stanislav Petlinsky. Already in 2017, Marsalek and Zlobina made a trip to Syria to visit Wagner Group units there. Marsalek then used the Wirecard company he managed to supply Wagner and other Russian military and influence groups in the Middle East. Through the Swiss adventure group MiGFlug, the pair were able to fly to Russia in an MiG-29 fighter jet.

In 2023, Marsalek contracted with a group composed of five Bulgarian nationals, all later arrested in London after trying to target Russian opposition across Europe. In their September 2023 trial, all five Bulgarians were accused of being part of a Russian spying network in the UK. The prosecution alleged that the network had been given its instructions by Jan Marsalek.

In March 2024, Der Spiegel's English-language website published a detailed investigation into Marsalek's alleged involvement with Russian state agencies. In summer 2023, Christo Grozev discovered evidence that Marsalek was living in Russia under the false identity of Alexander Ivanovich Schmidt, and had additionally been travelling under that name using a French passport.

The Austrian authorities report that Egisto Ott received €20,000 for a SINA laptop from Marsalek. In 2024, at the UK court case Marsalek was described as the person who coordinated the "Bulgarian spy ring" and paid one of the suspects Orlin Roussev £204,000 for his operations. Marsalek and Roussev remained in frequent contact, exchanging over 70,000 messages in Telegram between 2020–2024. Their primary targets were Christo Grozev and Roman Dobrokhotov. (Note: People in the spy cell convicted of spying for Russia include Orlin Roussev, Katrin Ivanova, Ivan Stoyanov, Tihomir Ivanchev, Vanya Gaberova and Biser Dzhambazov; and suspected of spying for Russia and were often closely associated with the spy cell of the previous six convicted Bulgarian nationals allegedly include Bulgarian nationals Cvetelina Gencheva, who resided in Sofia, spied on Roman Dobrokhotov in Berlin in support of the spy cell and allegedly used her employment in the airline industry to support the cell's individual targets by obtaining private personal flight details, and Tsvetanka Doncheva, who, in addition to spreading propaganda against Ukraine, lived in Vienna in an apartment across from where Christo Grozev lived and took pictures of his home that the spy cell used, according to a 24 March 2025 BBC article.)

== See also ==
- List of fugitives from justice who disappeared
- Antidote: 2024 documentary film produced by James Jones
