= Georges Blun =

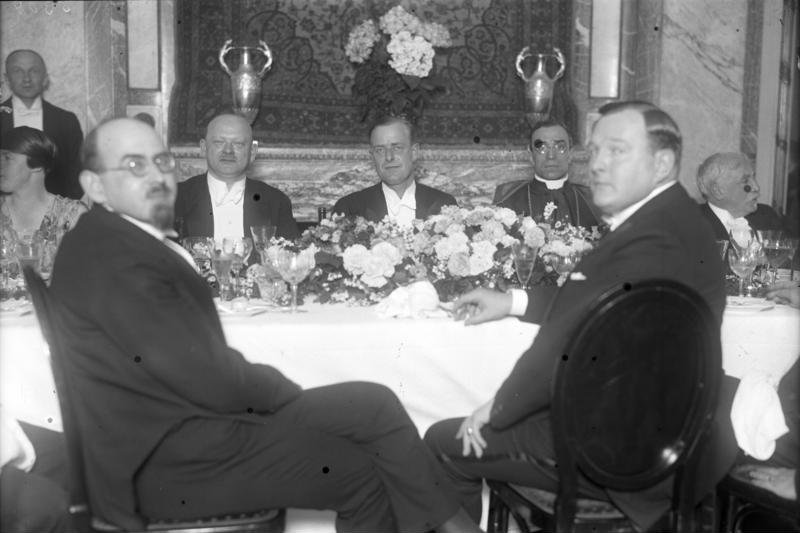
- Georges Blun, in the middle of the back row
- Born: 1 June 1893; Alsace-Lorraine, German Empire
- Died: 1999 (aged 105–106)
- Citizenship: French
- Occupations: Journalist, Spy
- Espionage activity
- Allegiance: United Kingdom; France; Switzerland; United States; Poland; Soviet Union
- Service branch: Red Three
- Codename: Long
- Operations: Red Orchestra

Georges Blun (1 June 1893 – 1999) was a French journalist and intelligence agent who was the Berlin correspondent of the Journal de Paris.

== Early life and World War I ==
Georges Blun was born to a French family on 1 June 1893 in the then German-held region of Alsace-Lorraine. He was married to a fellow journalist. He worked for the British MI5, as well as French intelligence during World War I.

== The interwar years ==
In 1920 he was expelled from Switzerland for conducting "clandestine activities" and communist agitation. By 1925, he had grown close to the leadership of the Communist Party of the Soviet Union.

From 1925 to 1930 he worked in the Weimar Republic as a correspondent for various newspapers, such as Journal des débats.

In 1928, it was reported that following publication of a controversial ('distorted') article on the Silvesternacht (New Year's Eve) in Berlin in a Paris paper, he resigned his chairmanship of the Association of Foreign Press and made an apology visit to the government press department.

He returned to Switzerland in 1939 after having worked as a journalist in Berlin for a considerable amount of time.

== World War II ==
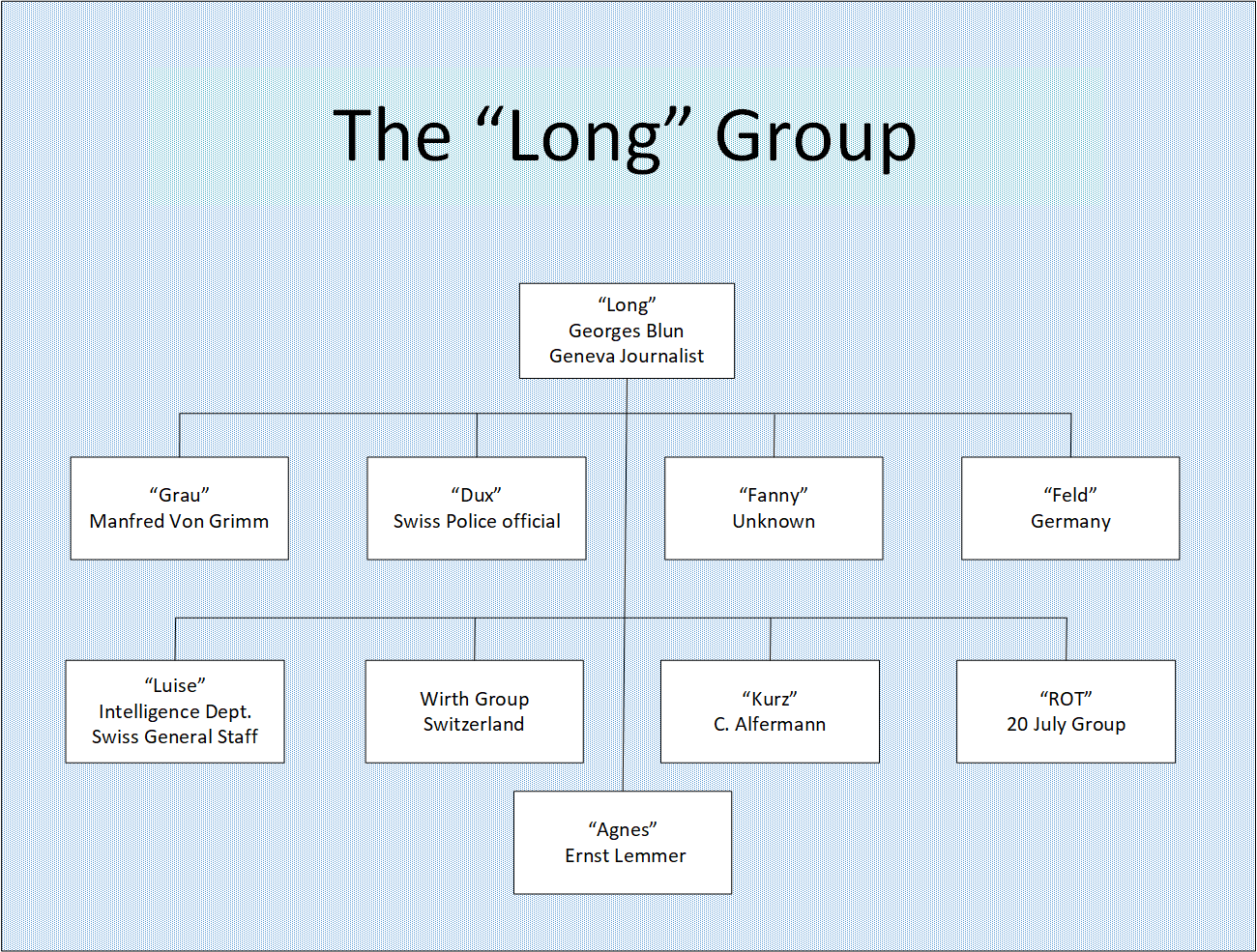
Diagram of the "Long" Group, led by Georges Blun

During World War II, he became a resistance fighter against Nazi Germany in the service of the Red Orchestra. Under the pseudonym "Long" he was the head of the eponymous George Blun group in Switzerland. This group formed part of the Red Three, led by Alexander Radó.

During the war, he spied primarily and most notably in service of the Soviet Union, but also worked for American, British, French, Swiss and Polish intelligence agencies as well – a fact described by at least one source covering the events as "common" among Switzerland-based spies at the time. His loyalties were described by Nigel West as "always prioritizing" the Communist International and the GRU, while the CIA assesses his group as having an "ambiguous" ideology.

During his clandestine activities, he worked with figures such as Hans Bernd Gisevius, members of the 20 July plot, as well as Joseph Wirth (who had served as Chancellor of Germany).

Blun's group was viewed by the Soviets as the second most valuable, after the group led by Rachel Dübendorfer.

== Post-War life ==
Blun survived the war, following which, along with Otto John and several others, he reportedly became a member of a political group led by Josef Müller. The group advocated for a united and neutralist Germany with a pro-USSR alignment.

He was still working as a journalist on 11 May 1950, when he penned an article in the French Le Monde newspaper regarding the division of Berlin and was cited for his work covering the division of the country.

He died in 1999.

== Publications ==
- L'Allemagne mise à nu (La nouvelle Soc. d'Édition, Paris, 1927, 183 p.) The Observer described it as being about "the German attitude toward foreign politics." Foreign Affairs stated it was, "Germany as seen by the Berlin correspondent of the Paris Journal."
