= Cutout (espionage) =

Channel for information exchange

In espionage parlance, a cutout is a mutually trusted intermediary, method or channel of communication that facilitates the exchange of information between agents. Cutouts usually know only the source and destination of the information to be transmitted, not the identities of any other persons involved in the espionage process (need to know basis). Thus, a captured cutout cannot be used to identify members of an espionage cell. The cutout also isolates the source from the destination, so neither necessarily knows the other.

== Outside espionage ==
Some computer protocols, like Tor, use the equivalent of cutout nodes in their communications networks. The use of multiple layers of encryption usually stops nodes on such networks from knowing the ultimate sender or receiver of the data.

In computer networking, darknets have some cutout functionality. Darknets are distinct from other distributed peer-to-peer (P2P) networks, as sharing is anonymous, i.e., IP addresses are not publicly shared and nodes often forward traffic to other nodes. Thus, with a darknet, users can communicate with little fear of governmental or corporate interference. Darknets are thus often associated with dissident political communications as well as various illegal activities.

== See also ==
- Dead drop
