= Albert Praun =

German general (1894–1975)

- Born: 11 December 1894; Bad Staffelstein, Kingdom of Bavaria, German Empire
- Died: 3 March 1975 (aged 80); Munich, West Germany
- Military career
- Allegiance: German Empire; Weimar Republic; Nazi Germany
- Branch: Army
- Service years: 1913–1945
- Rank: General der Nachrichtentruppe
- Commands: 18th Panzer Division; 129th Infantry Division; 277th Infantry Division; Chief Signals Officer of the OKW and OKH
- Conflicts: World War I World War II
- Awards: Knight's Cross of the Iron Cross

Albert Praun (11 December 1894 – 3 March 1975) was a German general who became the Chief Signals Officer of the Wehrmacht during World War II.

== Biography ==
Praun served during World War I. He was retained in the Reichswehr and then served in the Wehrmacht; between 1935 and 1940 he commanded signals units. In 1940 he was then appointed Chief Signals Officer of Panzer Group Hoth and Panzer Group Guderian in France. He was then posted to the Eastern Front where he served as Chief Signals Officer of the 2nd Panzer Group. He later was the commanding officer of the 4th Panzer Grenadier Brigade and then of the 18th Panzer Division, and the 129th and the 277th Divisions.

When General Erich Fellgiebel and then his deputy Fritz Thiele were arrested and subsequently executed for their roles in the 20 July plot, Praun was appointed to succeed them on 1 November 1944 as Chief Signals Officer at the Oberkommando der Wehrmacht and Oberkommando des Heeres and was promoted to General der Nachrichtentruppe.

At the end of the war in May 1945 Praun was taken into captivity by the western allies and interrogated in France about his activities when serving there. At the end of August 1945 he was moved to prison camps at Neustadt, Hesse and Bad Hersfeld and he was released from captivity in June 1947. In 1950 France requested Praun's extradition for war crimes committed when he served there, but the request was refused by the Americans on grounds of lack of evidence. In 1955, he was sentenced to death in absentia for the killings of 15 French resistance fighters. Praun lived in Munich until his death aged 80. He was the author of a lengthy report on German SIGINT in WW2, prepared for the USA, which was only released to the public in 2014.

== Awards ==
- Iron Cross (1914)
  - 2nd Class
  - 1st Class
- Wound Badge (1914)
  - in Black
- Honour Cross of the World War 1914/1918
- Wehrmacht-Dienstauszeichnung 4th to 1st Class
- Anschluss Medal
- Sudetenland Medal with Prague Castle Bar
- Iron Cross
  - 2nd Class
  - 1st Class
- Eastern Front Medal
- German Cross in Gold (7 February 1943)
- Knight's Cross of the Iron Cross on 27 October 1943 as Generalleutnant and commander of 129. Infanterie-Division

Military offices
Preceded by Generalleutnant Karl Freiherr von Thüngen	Commander of 18. Panzer-Division; July 1942 – 24 August 1942	Succeeded by Generalleutnant Karl Freiherr von Thüngen
Preceded by Generalleutnant Stephan Rittau	Commander of 129. Infanterie-Division; 22 August 1942 – 25 September 1943	Succeeded by Generalmajor Karl Fabiunke
Preceded by Generalleutnant Helmuth Huffmann	Commander of 277. Infanterie-Division; 5 April 1944 – August 1944	Succeeded by reformed as 277. Volks-Grenadier-Division
