= 709th Infantry Division =

709th Static Infantry Division
- German: 709. (bodenständige) Infanterie-Division
- Active: May 1941 – June 1944
- Country: Nazi Germany
- Branch: Army
- Type: Static infantry
- Role: Coastal Defence
- Size: Division
- Engagements: Invasion of Normandy

Commanders
- Notable commanders: Karl-Wilhelm von Schlieben

The 709th Static Infantry Division was a German Army infantry division in World War II. It was raised in May 1941 and used for occupation duties during the German occupation of France in World War II until the Allied invasion. It was on the Normandy coast when the invasion occurred and so fought in the Battle of Normandy. The division was trapped in the Cotentin Peninsula and destroyed in the defense of Cherbourg.

== History ==
The 709th Static Infantry Division was a coastal defence unit assigned to protect the eastern and northern coasts of the Cotentin Peninsula. This included the sites of the Utah Beachhead and the US airborne landing zones. Its sector covered over 250 km, running in a line from the northeast of Carentan, via Barfleur-Cherbourg-Cap de la Hague to a point west of Barneville. This included the 65 km land front of Cherbourg Harbour.

The Division included a number of "Ostlegionen" – eastern – units of various nationalities, mainly from the occupied countries of eastern Europe. These were a mixture of volunteers, conscripts and former Soviet prisoners-of-war who had chosen to fight in the German Army rather than suffer the harsh conditions of prisoners. Two battalions of the 739th Grenadier Regiment were Georgian battalions. Two further battalions were also designated as Ost units in the divisional order of battle. These battalions were led by German officers and NCOs.

The commander of the division at the time of the D-Day landings was General Karl-Wilhelm von Schlieben who took command in December 1943 after two and a half years of continuous command of Eastern Front combat units, including the 108th Panzer Grenadier Regiment, 4th Rifle Brigade, 208th Infantry Division and the 18th Panzer Division.

The quality of the troops in the 709th had been reduced as personnel were constantly transferred to the Eastern Front, including entire divisional combat units such as the 1st Battalion of the 739th Grenadier Regiment. A high percentage of the division had no combat experience. However, the 709th was acquainted with its sector and well-trained for defense. Still, after months of sustained labour on coastal defences, its combat readiness was significantly reduced.

Elements of the 709th were heavily engaged on D-Day, defending the peninsula against US airborne landings and against the US 4th Infantry Division landing on Utah Beach. Ten days later the division reported that it had sustained around 4,000 casualties from an initial strength of over 12,000. General Schlieben surrendered ‘Fortress’ Cherbourg to the Americans on 29 June 1944.

== Commanders ==
- Generalmajor Arnold von Beßel (3 May 1941 – 15 July 1942)
- Generalleutnant Albin Nake (15 July 1942 – 15 March 1943)
- General der Artillerie Curt Jahn (15 March 1943 – 1 July 1943)
- Generalmajor Eckkard von Geyso (1 July 1943 – 12 December 1943)
- Generalleutnant Karl-Wilhelm von Schlieben (12 December 1943 – 23 June 1944)

== Organization (June 1944) ==
- Command
- 729th Fortress Grenadier Regiment (with the 649th Ost Battalion attached)
- 739th Fortress Grenadier Regiment (with the 561st and 795th Georgian Battalions attached)
- 919th Grenadier Regiment (transferred from the 242nd Infantry Division in October 1943)
- 1709th Artillery Regiment
- 709th Antitank Battalion
- 709th Engineer Battalion
- 709th Signals Battalion
- Ost-Bataillon 635 (Russian) (CP: Donville-les-Bains)
- Ost-Bataillon 795 (Georgian) (Hauptmann Stiller – CP: Turqueville)
- Ost-Bataillon 797 (Georgian) (Hauptmann Peter Massberg – CP: Gouville)
