= Signal Corps of the Wehrmacht and Waffen SS =

German army communications unit

Standard of the Signal Corps

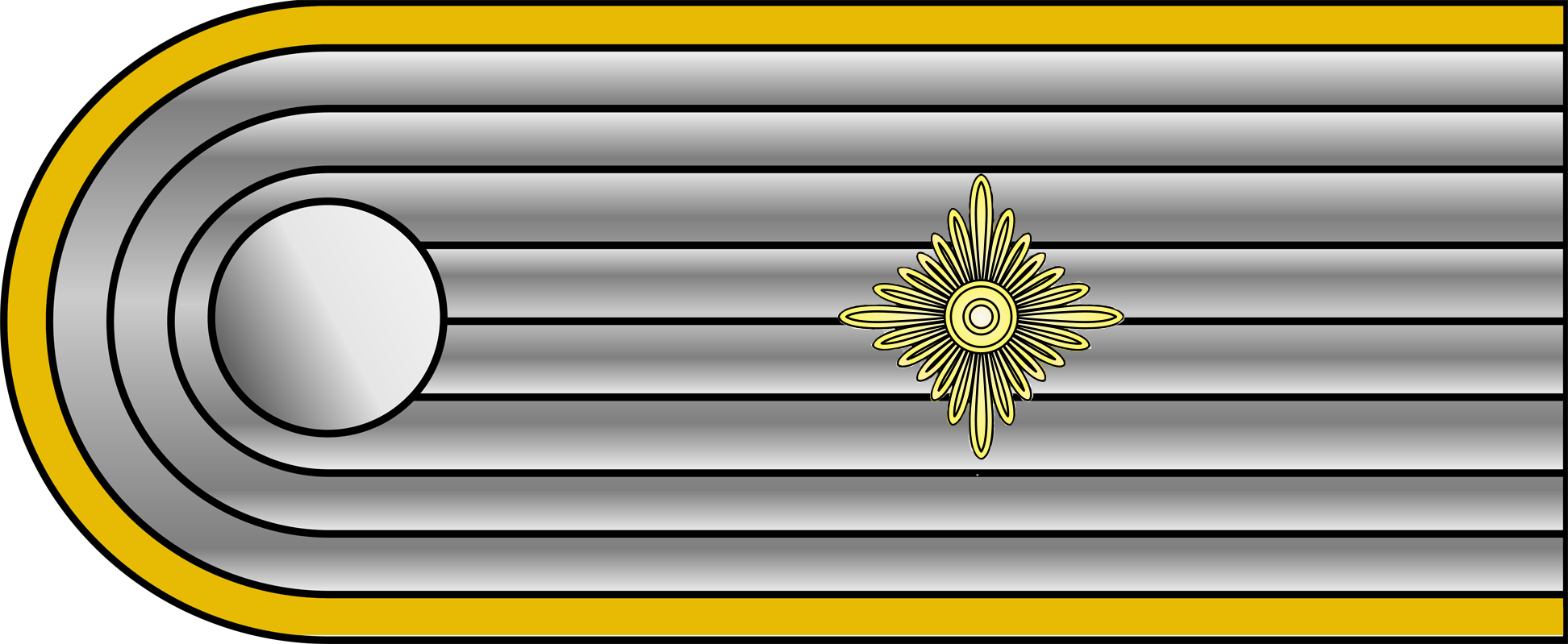
Lieutenant's epaulette in the lemon yellow corps colour

The Signal Corps or Nachrichtentruppe des Heeres, in the sense of signal troops, was an arm of service in the army of the German Wehrmacht and Waffen SS, whose role was to establish and operate military communications, especially using telephone and radio networks.

By order of the Oberkommando der Wehrmacht dated 14 Oct 1942, it was part of the combat arms of the German Wehrmacht and Waffen SS until 1945.

The colour allocated by the Wehrmacht and Waffen SS in 1935 to their signal corps was lemon yellow. By contrast, the corps colour of the air force signal troops of the Luftwaffe was brown.

== Background: First World War and Reichswehr ==
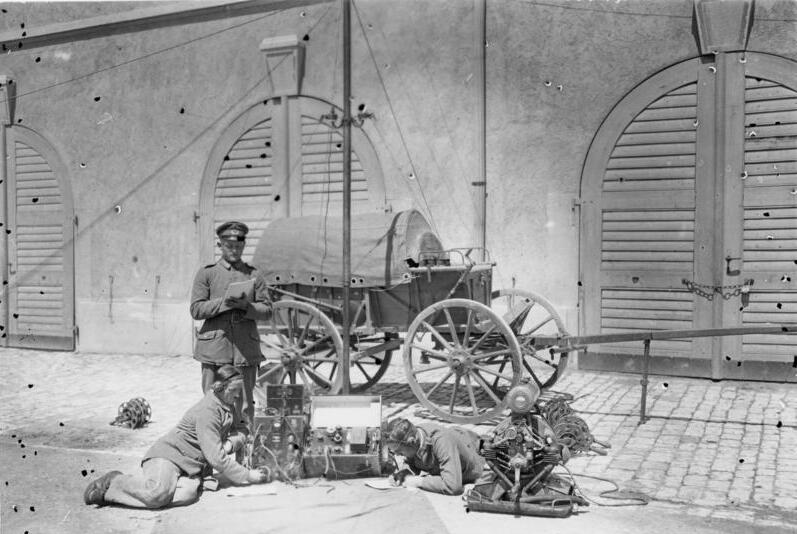
Signals detachment with light army field vehicle during the First World War

The precursor of the German Signal Corps was the Telegraph Corps formed in 1899 as a separate arm of service. Telegraph battalions, fortress and army signal units were not combined into the Signal Corps, the Nachrichtentruppe, until 1917, during the First World War. In addition to radio and telephone communications, the newly developed teleprinters, carrier pigeons and heliographs were used for messaging. During the First World War, radio telegraphy took on increasing importance. For example, in 1915 teleprinters were first used by the air force, for artillery observation. In 1916, the first signalmen equipped with mobile radios were operating on the front line.

In the Reichswehr from 1921 each division had a communications unit with two companies. As well as radio and telephone communications, signal pigeons were also used for the transmission of information. From 1930, Enigma cypher machines were used for the first time to automatically encrypt secret information.

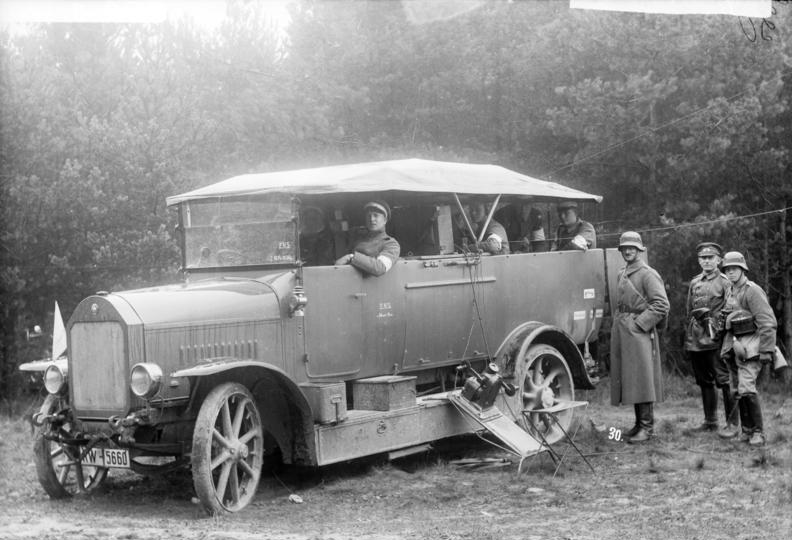
Mercedes signals vehicle of the Reichswehr in 1925

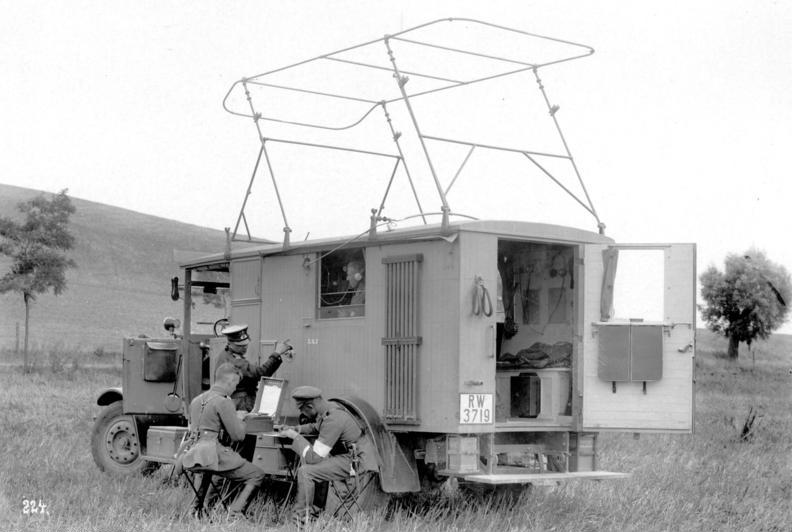
Mobile radio station of the Mobiler Landfunkdienst on a Reichswehr HF signals wagon (HF-Funkenwagen) in 1928

== Signal Corps of the Wehrmacht ==
=== Creation ===
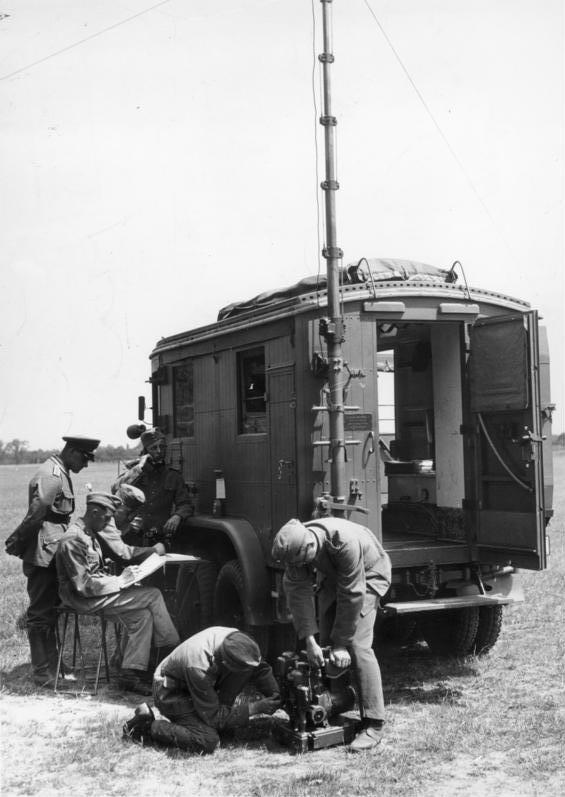
Mobile radio station of the Mobiler Landfunkdienst on a signal vehicle (HF long-haul communications) (Funkenwagen (HF-Weitverkehr)) on exercise in summer 1935

During the rearming of the Wehrmacht the first top secret rearmament measures were carried out in spring 1933. These measures included the formation of new units and the establishment of a second signal company in existing units, the recruiting of officer cadets resulting in an eightfold increase over that on 1 April 1933, the reinforcing of the officer and NCO cadre by former signals soldiers, and their training through various courses. From 1934, from the old signal units the required cadre of officers and soldiers was drawn for the establishment of new formations, the divisions of the Wehrmacht each receiving a signal unit. Meanwhile, the Signal Corps steadily expanded its field of expertise; they now had light, medium and heavy telephone troops, telephone exchange and telephone operating troops, telegraph construction troops, light and heavy radio troops, miniature radio troops, two-way radio troops, radio surveillance troops, patrol radio troops, cypher and evaluation troops and battery charging troops.

From 1935, the training of the Signal Corps was carried out at the Army and Air Force Signal School (Heeres- und Luftnachrichtenschule) and, from 1936, the Army Signal School (Heeresnachrichtenschule) in Halle-Dölau. Two central bunker systems were built as communication centres in Zossen and in Ohrdruf.

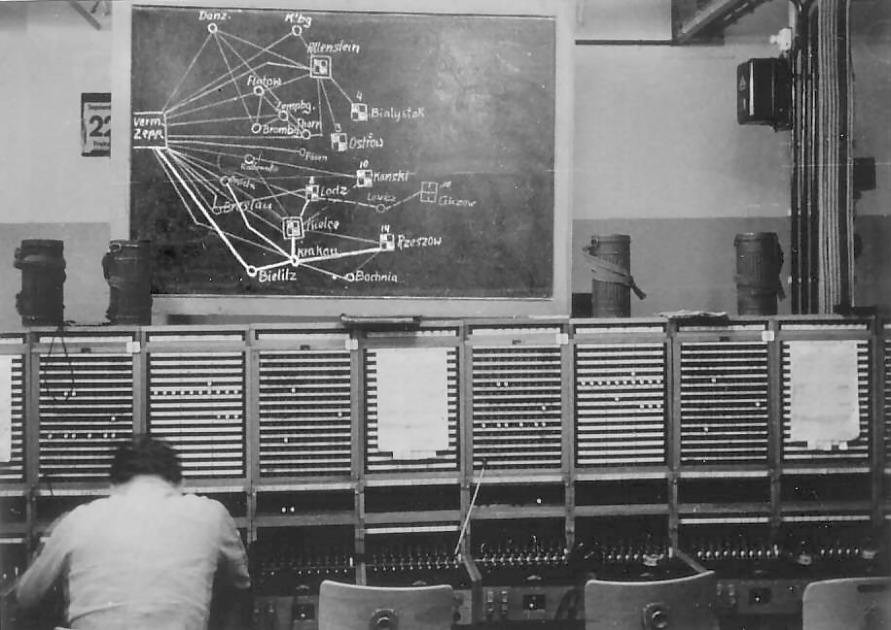
Overview board in the Zeppelin exchange in 1939

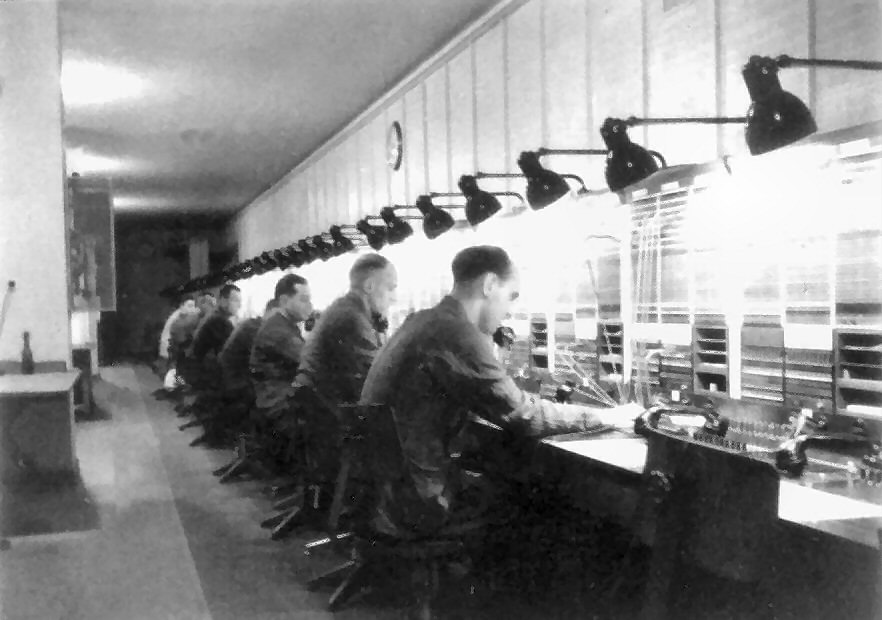
Exchange in the Zeppelin central signals bunker in 1942

From a special-to-arm perspective the Corps was led by the Inspector of the Signal Corps (Inspekteur der Nachrichtentruppen) at the Oberkommando des Heeres, the individual formations and units were subordinated to their respective commanders in the field army.

=== Organisation and strength ===
At the start of the war the Signal Corps had:

- 104 divisional signal units with a headquarters, telephone company, radio company and light supply column
- 23 corps signal units with a telephone company, radio company, two telephone and radio companies and a light supply column
- 10 signal regiments and 12 field signal commands at army and army group level with HQs, a 1st (Operating) Unit (I. Abteilung (Betrieb)) with a telephone and a radio company, as well as a 2nd and 3rd (Construction) Unit (II. und III. Abteilung (Bau)) each with an operating and three construction companies
- 7 surveillance companies for communications surveillance
- 45 independent truck cable construction, telephone operating and telephone construction companies;
- 14 signal reserve units

In addition, at unit level there were the signal troops of the combat forces like, for example, those in the artillery or chemical warfare units. They did not belong to the Corps of Signals, but were integrated into the formations and units and were subordinated to the commanders of their respective companies, batteries and squadrons.

The propaganda forces were also part of the Corps of Signals until 1942, but then became an independent arm of service.

As more large formations were created during the war, numerous new and reserve units were established including independent signal companies or special units, among them the wire construction companies, decimetre band (i.e. UHF) radio relay companies, carrier frequency companies, telephone exchange companies and telephone maintenance companies.

=== Deployment during the Second World War ===
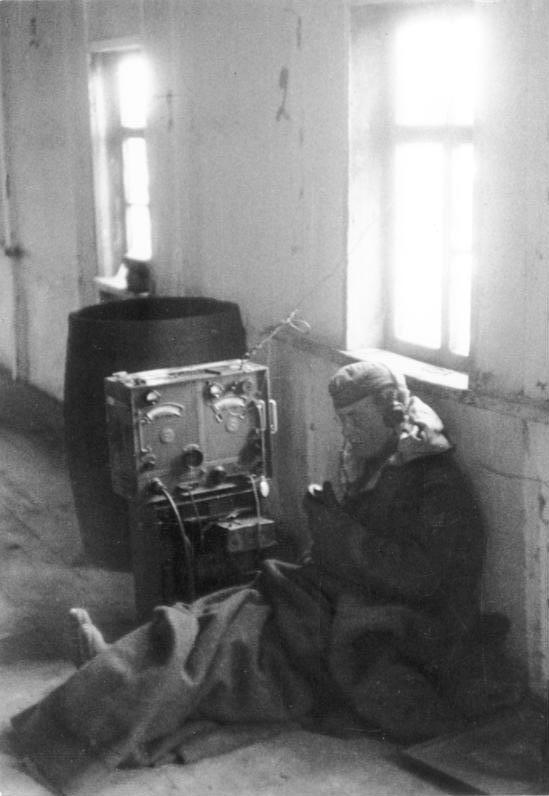
Signalman with radio (transmitter and receiver), Russia, 1942

The Inspector and General of Signals Erich Fellgiebel, who was executed in 1944 for his part in the 20 July plot against Hitler, was credited with saying: "The Signal Corps have a tough time. You can't smell them, they don't make a noise, most people don't notice that they exist at all unless the communications stop working."

== Postwar development ==
Both the lemon yellow corps colour and the name Nachrichtentruppe were retained by East Germany's army, the NVA, until 1990.

On the other hand, the German Bundeswehr changed the name to Fernmeldetruppe, but kept lemon yellow as the corps colour.

== Gallery ==
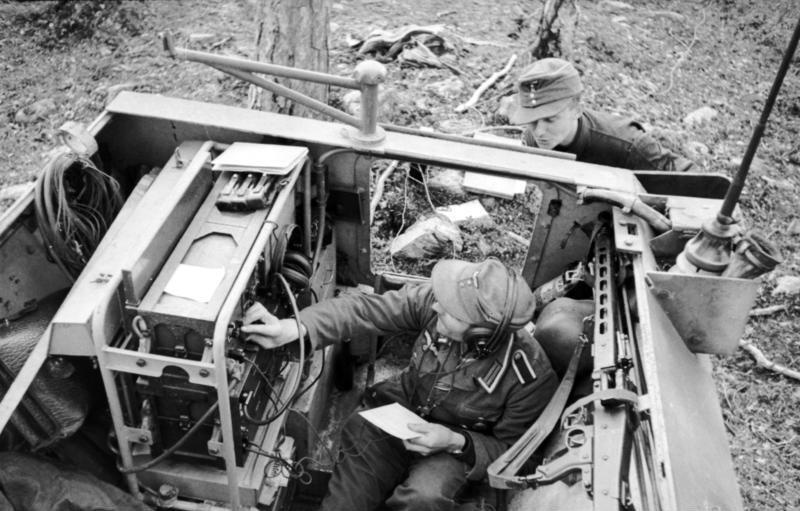
Signaller in armoured radio vehicle Sd.Kfz. 250/5

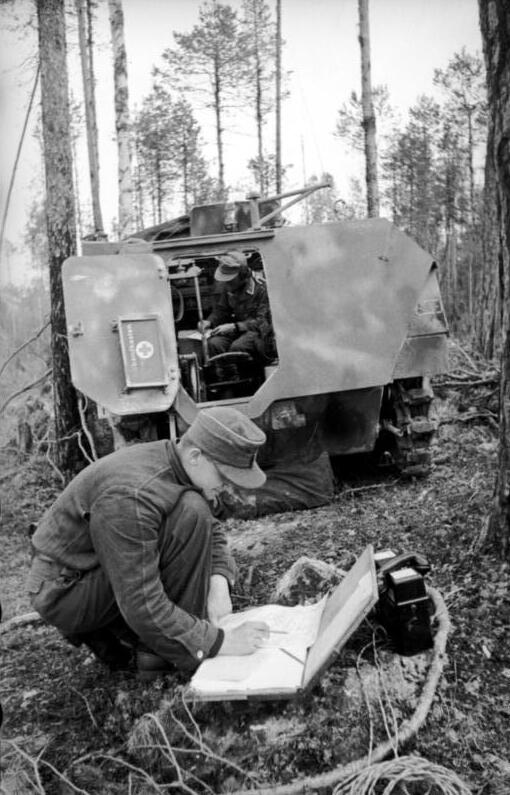
Signallers in Lapland

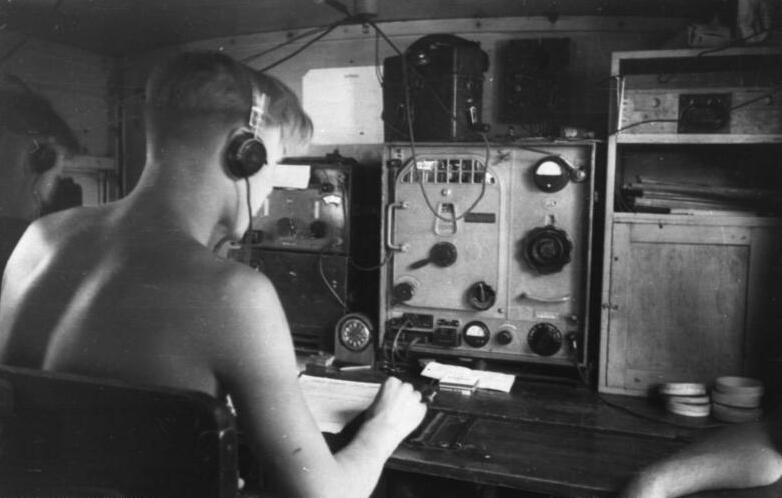
Signaller on operations, Warsaw Uprising 1944

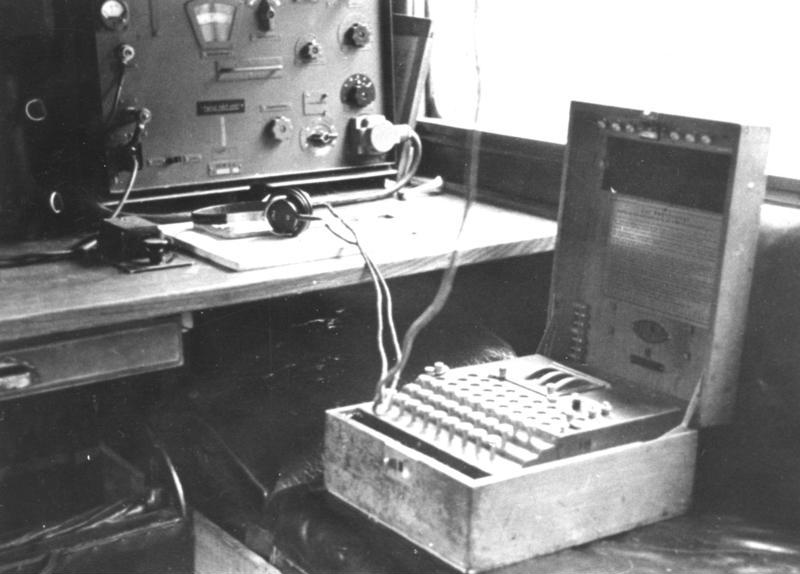
Enigma cypher machine of the 7th Panzer Division, Eastern Front, 1941

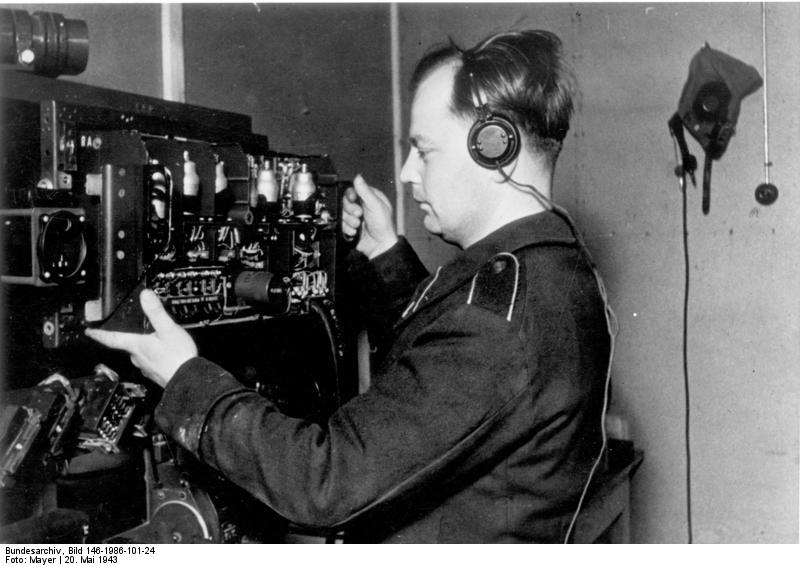
Radio being repaired, 1943

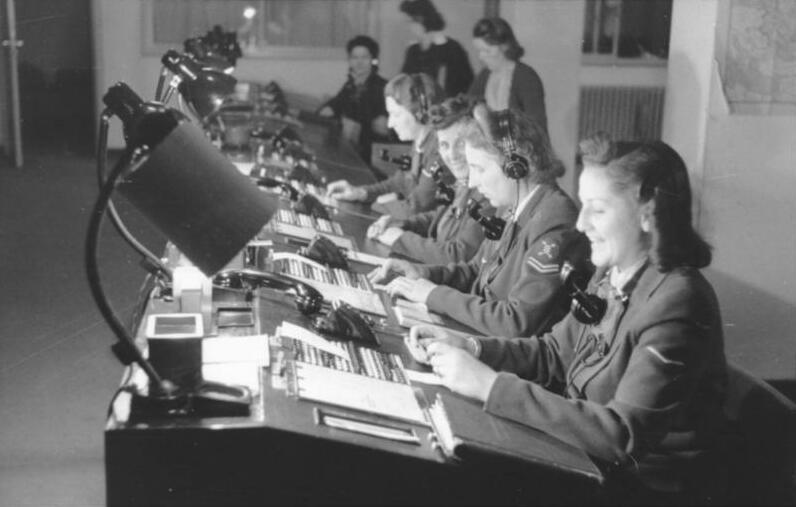
Female telephone operators manning an exchange, France 1944

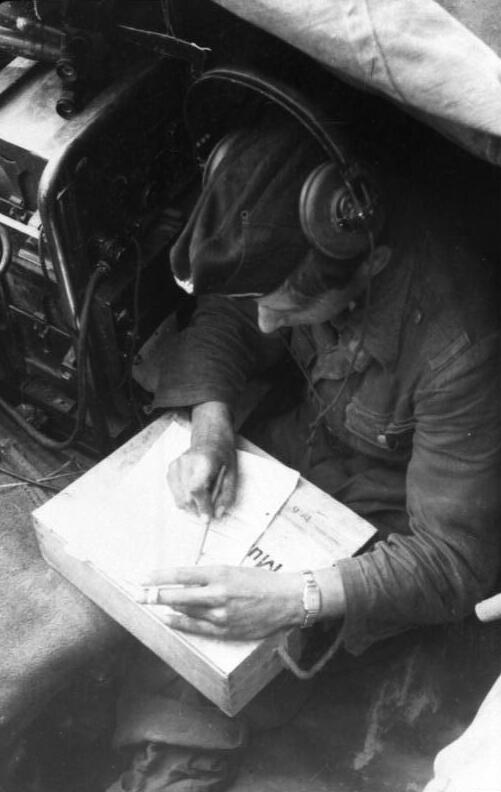
Taking down a radio message, Warsaw 1944

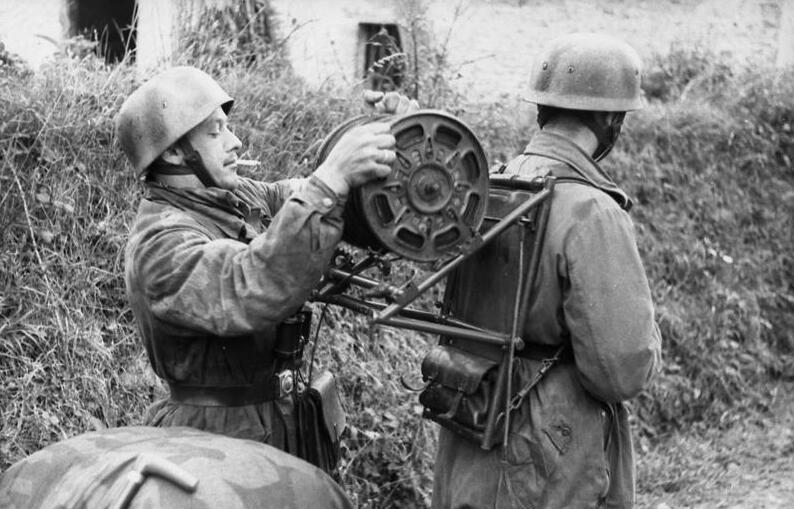
Field cable section with German paratroopers, France 1944

== Sources ==
=== Literature ===
- Hans-Georg Kampe: Die Heeres-Nachrichtentruppe der Wehrmacht 1935–1945. Dörfler-Verlag, 2003. ISBN 3-89555-098-1.
- Albert Praun, Hella Praun: Albert Praun – Ein deutsches (Soldaten-) Leben 1894–1975. Kastner-Verlag, 2004. ISBN 3-937082-22-0.

=== External links ===
- Hans-Georg Kampe Employment and end of the Army Nachrichtentruppe of the Wehrmacht, accessed on 20 May 2012
- History of the Development of Military Cable Communications in the Reichswehr, Wehrmacht and Bundeswehr 1896–1965 accessed on 21 May 2012
- Museum of Military Technology, accessed on 21 May 2012
