= 129th Infantry Division (Wehrmacht) =

- 129. Infanterie-Division
- Divisional insignia
- Active: 1941–45
- Country: Nazi Germany
- Branch: Army
- Type: Infantry
- Size: Division
- Engagements: World War II: Operation Barbarossa; Battle of Białystok–Minsk; Battle of Smolensk; Battles of Rzhev; Operation Bagration; East Prussian Offensive

Commanders
- Notable commanders: Heribert von Larisch

The 129th Infantry Division (German: Hessen-Thuerinische 129. Infanterie-Division) was an Infantry Division of the German Army during World War II.

== History ==
The 129th Infantry Division was formed in Hanau, in Wehrkreis XI on 20 October 1940 as Division 11 and incorporated personnel from Hessen and Thuringia. Elements of 9th, 33rd and 251st Infantry Divisions formed approximately 30% of the division.

After the training of the division ended in April 1941, it was sent to East Prussia and took part in Operation Barbarossa. As part of Army Group Center, the division fought in several battles of the central sector of the Eastern Front, such as those in Białystok, Smolensk and Vyazma. In October–November 1941 the division suffered heavy casualties defending the Kalinin Bridgehead and on 25 December it absorbed the 326th and 369th Regiments of the destroyed 162nd Infantry Division. The 236th Artillery Regiment of 162nd Infantry Division was incorporated into the 129th Artillery Regiment of the division as well. The following year it took part in the heavy fighting near Rzhev, where it remained from November 1941 to early March 1943.

After the retreat from Rzhev, the division fought in Bryansk, Mogilev and Vitebsk, while it was reinforced with the 566th Grenadier Regiment of the 390th Field Training Division. Due to the high losses suffered in central Belorussia, namely in Bobruisk and Baranavichy, it was reorganised in July 1944. In January 1944, the division was still fighting near Narew, in Różan, but was soon forced to retreat. The 129th Infantry Division was eventually destroyed in East Prussia and disbanded around February. The surviving elements were transferred into the 4th Army and fought in the last battles in East Prussia. The Headquarters of the division served as the Kommandatur of Frisches Haff.

== Commanders ==
- Generalleutnant Stephan Rittau (1 October 1940 - 22 August 1942) (Killed in Action)
- General der Nachrichtentruppe Albert Praun (22 August 1942 - 25 September 1943)
- Generalmajor Karl Fabiunke (25 September 1943 - 31 January 1944)
- Generalleutnant Heribert von Larisch (31 January 1944 - 11 February 1945)
- Generalmajor Bernhard Ueberschär (11 February - 8 May 1945)

== Sources ==
- Mitcham, Samuel W. (2007). German Order of Battle, Volume One: 1st to 290th Infantry Divisions in World War II. Mechanicsburg, Pennsylvania: Stackpole Books. ISBN 978-0811734165.
