= 574th Volksgrenadier Division =

- 574. Volksgrenadier-Division
- 547th Volks-Grenadier Division Vehicle Insignia
- Country: Nazi Germany
- Branch: Army
- Type: Infantry
- Size: Division

The 574th Volksgrenadier Division (German: 574. Volksgrenadier-Division) was a German military unit during World War II. It formed on 25 August 1944 from the remnants of the previously annihilated 277th Infantry Division. On 4 September 1944 the unit was renamed to 277th Volksgrenadier Division.
