= Stephan Rittau =

- Born: 27 December 1891; Wongrowitz, Province of Posen, German Empire
- Died: 22 August 1942 (aged 50); Rzhev, Soviet Union
- Military career
- Allegiance: German Empire; Weimar Republic; Nazi Germany
- Branch: Army
- Service years: 1911–1942
- Rank: Generalleutnant
- Commands: 129th Infantry Division
- Conflicts: World War II: Invasion of Poland; Battle of France; Operation Barbarossa; Battle of Białystok–Minsk; Battle of Smolensk (1941); Battle of Moscow; Battles of Rzhev †
- Awards: Knight's Cross of the Iron Cross

Stephan Rittau (27 December 1891 – 22 August 1942) was a general in the Wehrmacht of Nazi Germany during World War II. He was a recipient of the Knight's Cross of the Iron Cross. Rittau was killed on 22 August 1942 in Rzhev, Soviet Union.

== Awards and decorations ==
- Knight's Cross of the Iron Cross on 2 November 1941 as Generalmajor and commander of 129. Infanterie-Division

Military offices
| Preceded by None | Commander of 129. Infanterie-Division; 1 October 1940 – 22 August 1942 | Succeeded by General der Nachrichtentruppen Albert Praun |
