= Battle of Cherbourg =

1944 battle of World War II

- Part of the Normandy Campaign, World War II
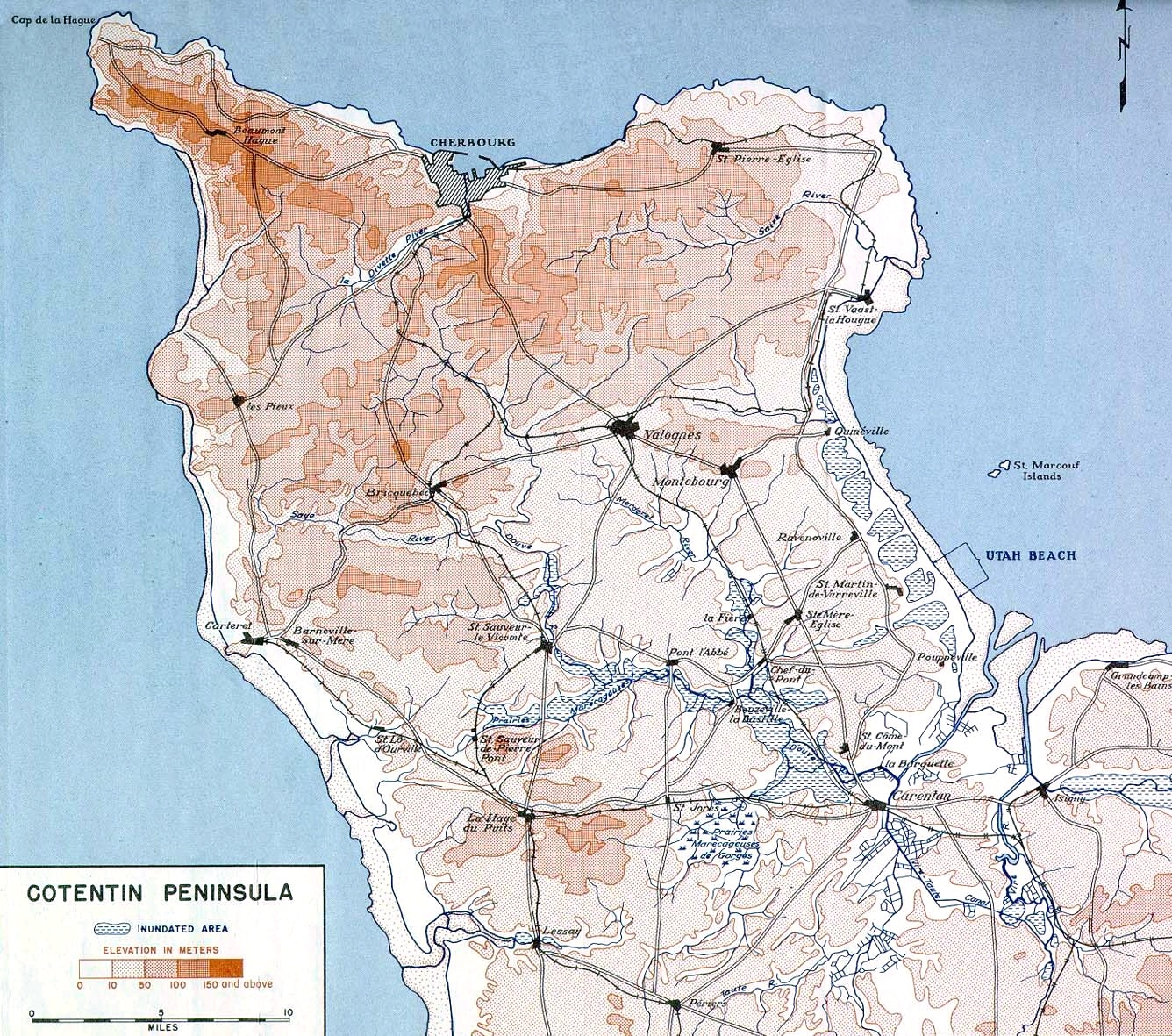
- Cotentin Peninsula and port of Cherbourg, 1944
Date	6 June – 1 July 1944 (Cotentin Peninsula); 22–27 June 1944 (Cherbourg)
Location	Normandy, France 49°38′20″N 1°36′58″W
Result	Allied victory

Belligerents
United States; United Kingdom	Germany

Commanders and leaders
(United States) J. Lawton Collins (United States) Matthew Ridgway	(Nazi Germany) Friedrich Dollmann (Nazi Germany) Karl-Wilhelm von Schlieben

Strength
Unknown	40,000

Casualties and losses
2,800 killed in action; 5,700 missing; 13,500 wounded; Total: 22,000	7,000 killed; 30,000 captured; Total: 37,000–38,000+

The Battle of Cherbourg was part of the Battle of Normandy during World War II. It was fought immediately after the successful Allied landings on 6 June 1944. Allied troops, mainly American, isolated and captured the fortified port, which was considered vital to the campaign in Western Europe, in a hard-fought, month-long campaign.

== Allied plans ==
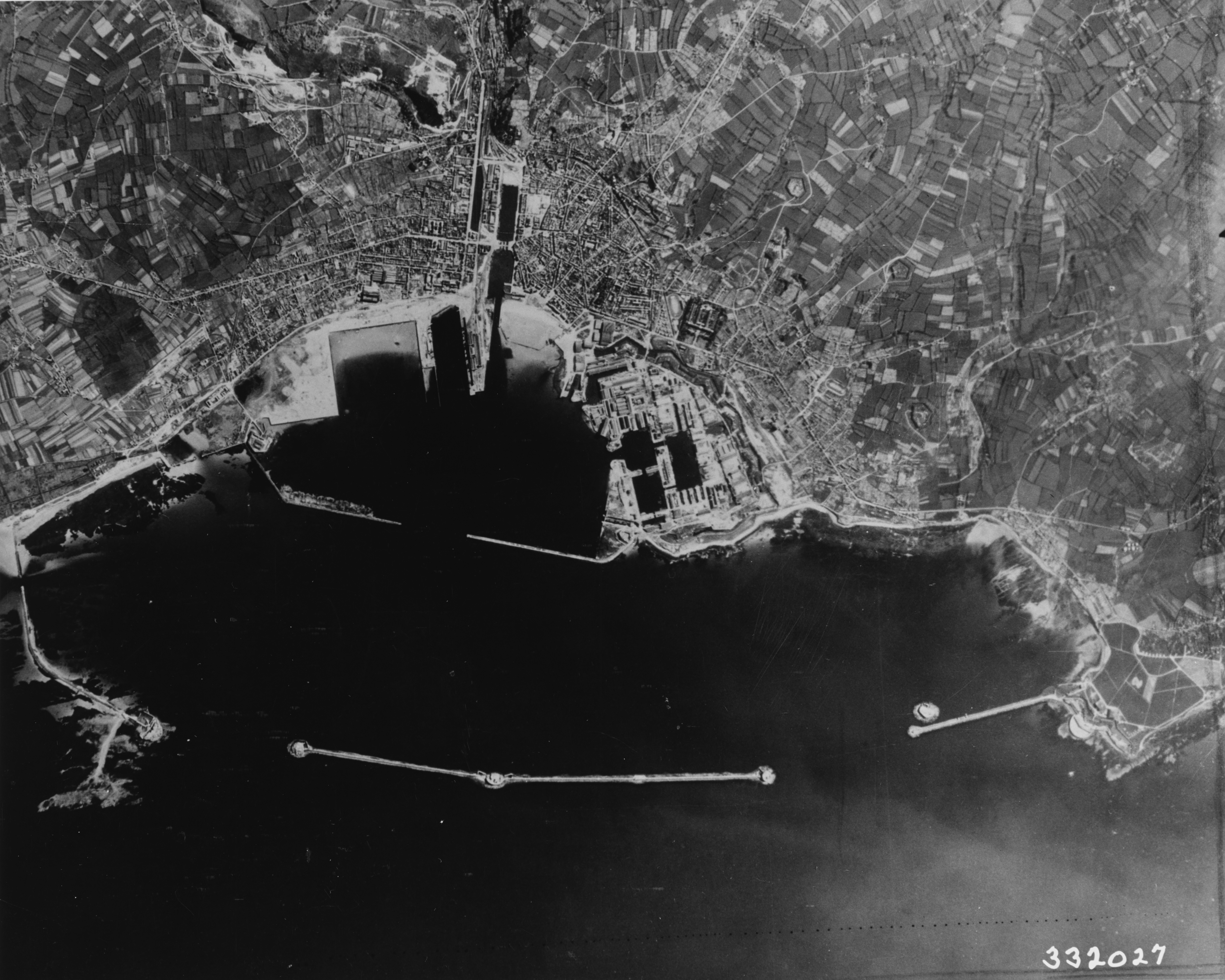
An aerial photograph of Cherbourg taken in 1944

When they drew up their plans for the invasion of France, the Allied staff considered that it would be necessary to secure a deep-water port to allow reinforcements to be brought directly from the United States. (Without such a port, equipment packed for transit would first have to be unloaded at a port in Great Britain, unpacked, waterproofed and then reloaded onto landing craft to be transferred to shallow-water facilities in France). Cherbourg, at the end of the Cotentin Peninsula, was the largest port accessible from the landings.

The Allied planners decided at first not to land directly on the Cotentin Peninsula, since this sector would be separated from the main Allied landings by the Douve river valley, which had been flooded by the Germans to deter airborne landings. On being appointed overall land commander for the invasion in January 1944, British Army General Bernard Montgomery reinstated the landing on the Cotentin peninsula, partly to widen the front and therefore prevent the invaders becoming sealed into a narrow lodgement, but also to enable a rapid capture of Cherbourg.

== Landings ==
In the early hours of 6 June paratroopers (the US 82nd and 101st Airborne Divisions) landed at the base of the Cotentin Peninsula. Although the landings were scattered, they nevertheless secured most of the routes by which the US VII Corps would advance from Utah Beach. The US 4th Infantry Division landed on Utah Beach shortly after dawn with few casualties.

In the immediate aftermath of the landings the priority for the invasion forces at Utah Beach was to link up with the main Allied landings further east. On 9 June, the 101st Airborne Division managed to cross the Douve river valley. The next day, following vicious house-to-house fighting during the Battle of Carentan, the airborne troops were able to take the town, ensuring the Allies a continuous front. The front was maintained despite a German counterattack reinforced by armored units on the 13th, known as the Battle of Bloody Gulch.

== Move across the Cotentin Peninsula ==
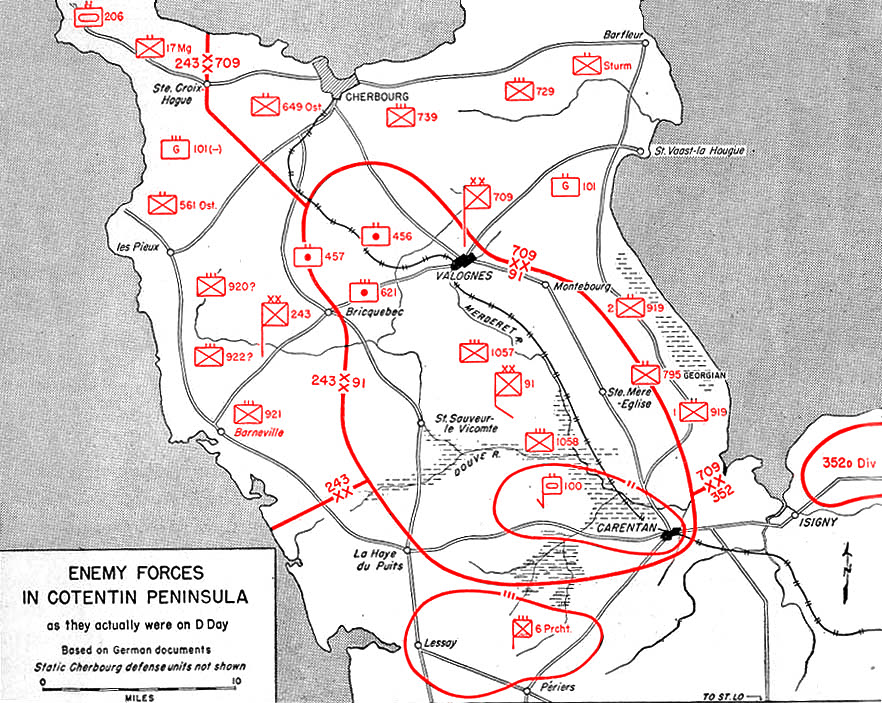
German forces on the Cotentin Peninsula prior to Operation Overlord

This success allowed VII Corps to advance westwards to cut off the Cotentin Peninsula. An additional three infantry divisions had landed to reinforce the Corps. Major General J. Lawton Collins, the Corps Commander, drove his troops hard, replacing units in the front lines or sacking officers if progress was slow.

The Germans facing VII Corps were a mix of regiments and battlegroups from several divisions, many of which had already suffered heavy casualties fighting the American airborne troops in the first days of the landings. Very few German armored or mobile troops could be sent to this part of the front because of the threat to Caen further east. Infantry reinforcements arrived only slowly. Tactically, the Germans' flooding of the Douve worked against them because it secured the Allied southern flank.

By 16 June there were no further natural obstacles in front of the American forces. The German command was in some confusion. Erwin Rommel and other commanders wished to withdraw their troops in good order into the Atlantic Wall fortifications of Cherbourg, where he believed they could withstand a siege for some time but Adolf Hitler demanded that they hold their present lines.

Late on 17 June, Hitler agreed that the troops might withdraw but specified that they were to occupy a new, illogical defensive line, spanning the entire peninsula just south of Cherbourg. Rommel protested against this order, but he nevertheless relieved General Wilhelm Fahrmbacher, commanding the LXXXIV Corps, who he thought was trying to circumvent it.

== Assault on Cherbourg ==
On 18 June the US 9th Infantry Division reached the west coast of the peninsula, isolating the Cherbourg garrison from any potential reinforcements. Within 24 hours, the 4th Infantry, 9th and 79th Infantry Divisions were driving north on a broad front. There was little opposition on the western side of the peninsula and on the eastern side, and the exhausted defenders around Montebourg collapsed. Several large caches of V-1 flying bombs were discovered by the Americans in addition to a V-2 rocket installation at Brix.

In two days, the American divisions were within striking distance of Cherbourg. The garrison commander, Lieutenant General Karl-Wilhelm von Schlieben, had 21,000 men but many of these were hastily drafted naval personnel or from labour units. The fighting troops who had retreated to Cherbourg (including the remnants of von Schlieben's own division, the 709th), were tired and disorganised. Food, fuel and ammunition were in short supply despite attempts by the Luftwaffe to drop in supplies. Nevertheless, von Schlieben rejected a summons to surrender and began carrying out demolitions to deny the port to the Allies.

Collins launched a general assault on 22 June. Resistance was stiff at first, but the Americans slowly cleared the Germans from their bunkers and concrete pillboxes. Allied naval ships bombarded fortifications near the city on 25 June. On 26 June, the British elite force No. 30 Commando also known as 30 Assault Unit launched an assault on Octeville – a suburb to the south west of Cherbourg. This was the location of the Kriegsmarine naval intelligence HQ at Villa Meurice which the Commandos captured along with 20 officers and 500 men. On the same day the 79th Division captured Fort du Roule, which dominated the city and its defenses. This finished any organised defense. Von Schlieben was captured. The harbor fortifications and the arsenal surrendered on 29 June, after a ruse by Allied officers, Captain Blazzard and Colonel Teague, who convinced the German officers to surrender the peninsula, bluffing about their manpower and ordnance. Some German troops cut off outside the defenses held out until 1 July.

Additionally, U.S. Coast Guard Commander Quentin R. Walsh led a 53 man specially trained naval reconnaissance unit to determine the condition of the port. Armed with bazookas, hand grenades, rifles and submachine guns, he and his party overcame sniper fire and blew open steel doors of underground bunkers. About 400 of the Germans in the arsenal area surrendered. Walsh's command went on to capture Fort Du Homet and its garrison of 350 men. In all, his 53-man special force was credited with taking about 750 German prisoners and liberating 52 captured American paratroopers. For his actions in and around Cherbourg beginning 9 June, he received the Navy Cross. The citation for the award noted:

"Heroism as Commanding Officer of a U.S. Naval party reconnoitering the naval facilities and naval arsenal at Cherbourg June 26 and 27, 1944. While in command of a reconnaissance party, Commander Walsh entered the port of Cherbourg and penetrated the eastern half of the city, engaging in street fighting with the enemy. He accepted the surrender and disarmed 400 of the enemy force at the naval arsenal and later received unconditional surrender of 350 enemy troops and, at the same time, released 52 captured U.S. Army paratroopers. His determination and devotion to duty were instrumental in the surrender of the last inner fortress of the Arsenal."

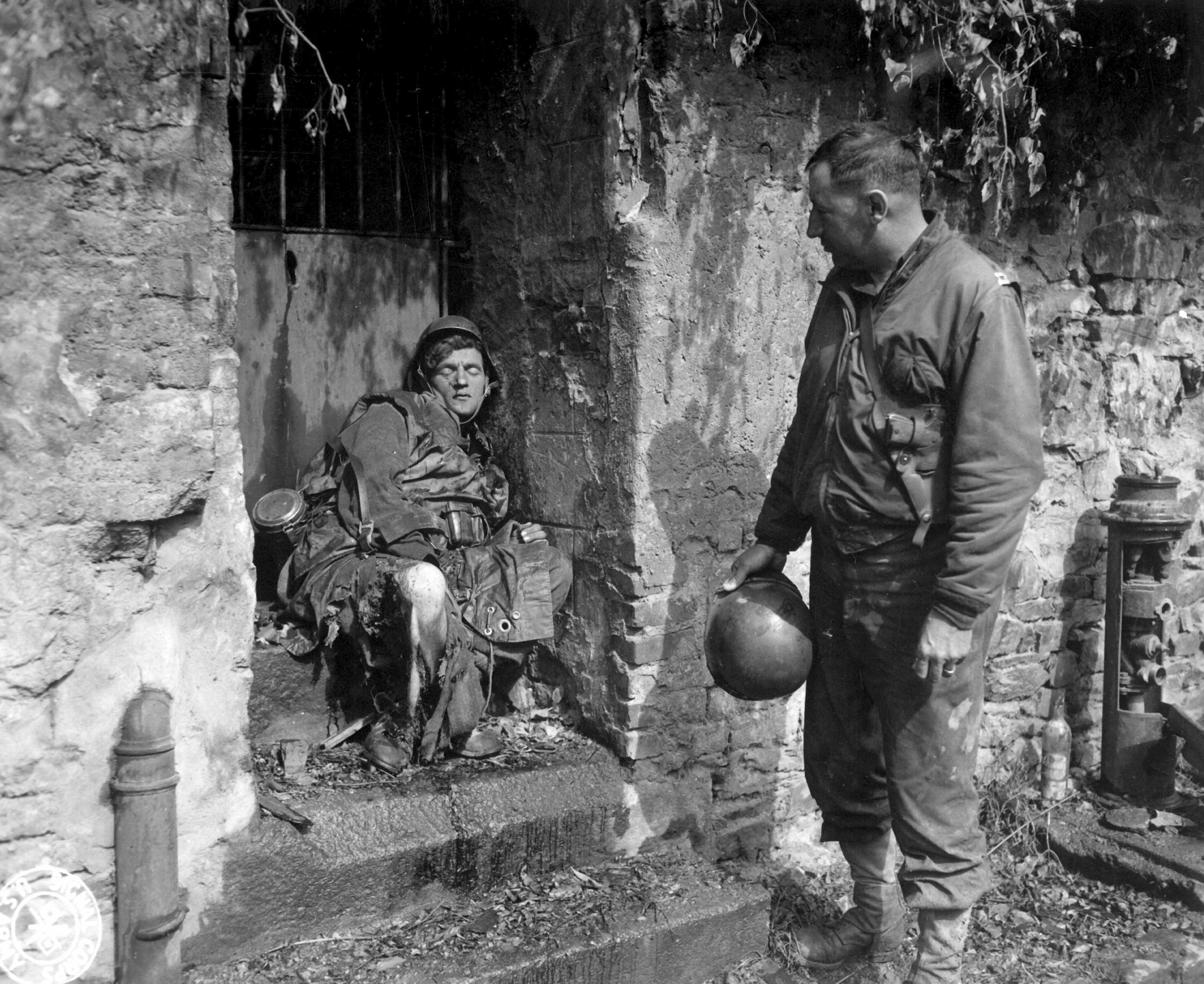
Dead German soldier, one of the last holdouts inside the city

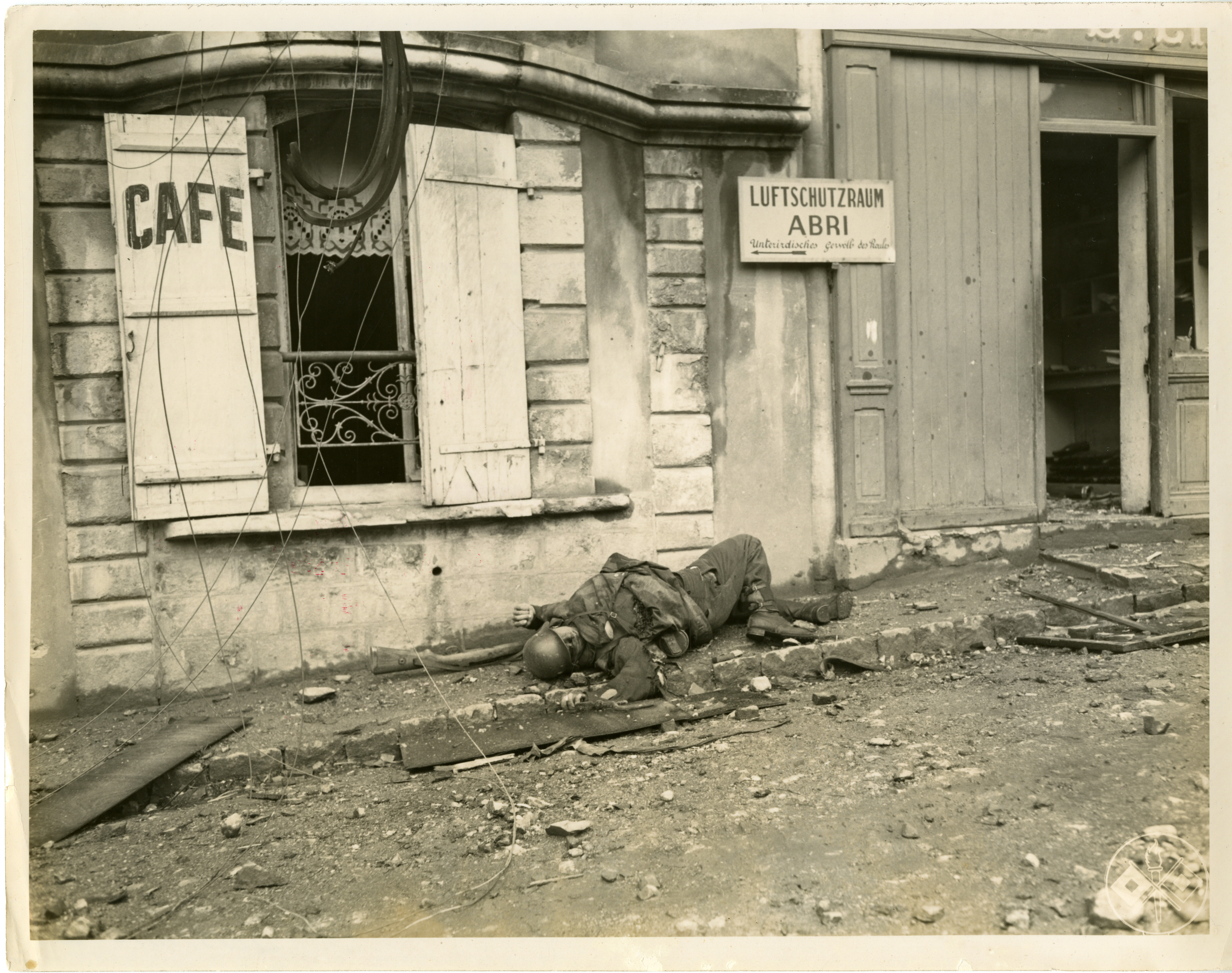
Dead German soldier in the streets of Cherbourg

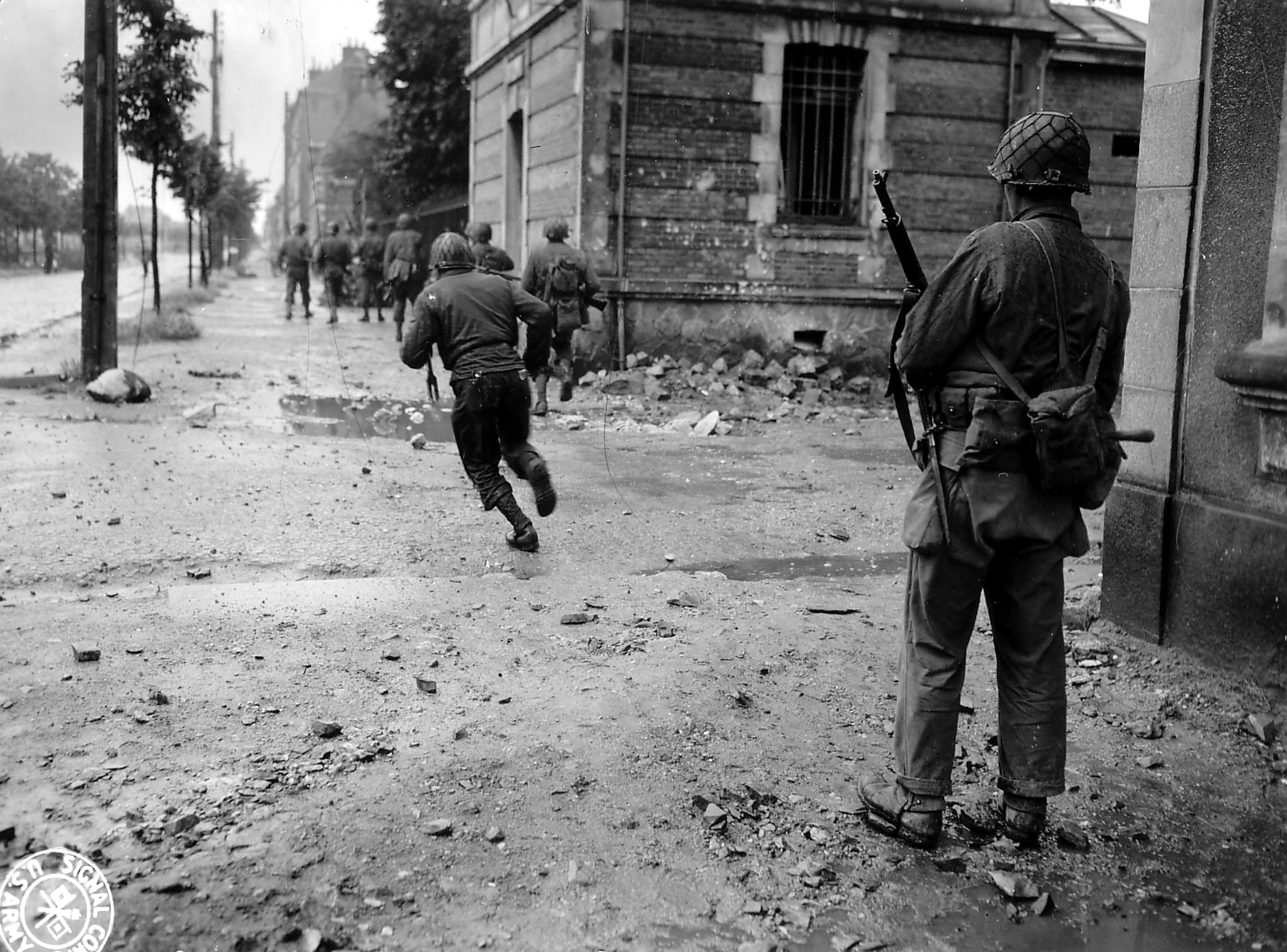
American soldiers in Cherbourg

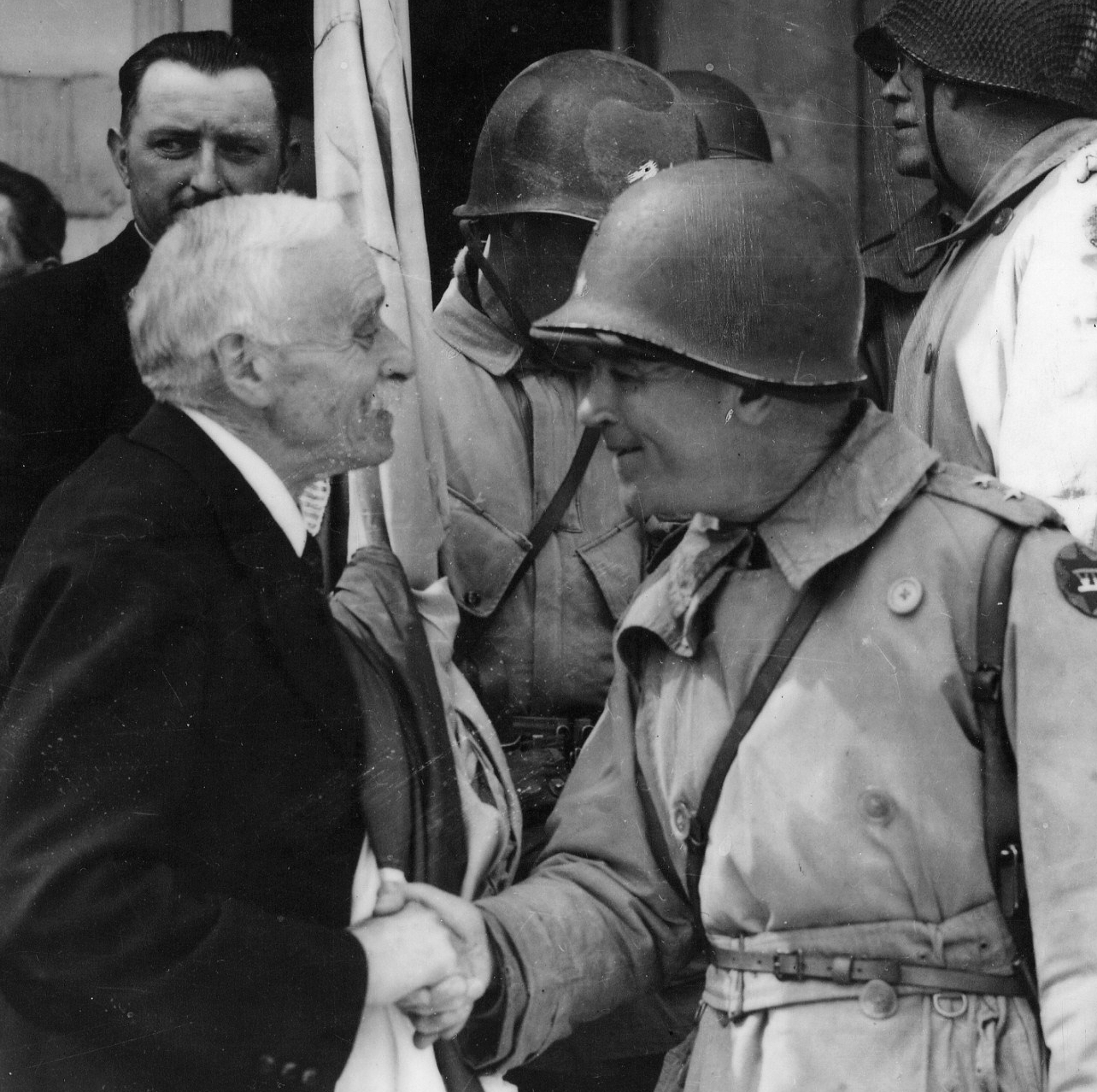
Cherbourg Mayor Paul Renault thanks General Collins for liberating the city.

== Aftermath ==
The Germans had so thoroughly wrecked and mined the port of Cherbourg that Hitler awarded the Knight's Cross to Rear Admiral Walter Hennecke the day after he surrendered for "a feat unprecedented in the annals of coastal defense." The port was not brought into limited use until the middle of August, although the first ships were able to use the harbor in late July. Nevertheless, the Germans had suffered a major defeat as a result of a rapid Allied build up on their western flank. General Friedrich Dollmann, commanding the German Seventh Army, died on 28 June, having just been informed of a court martial pending as a result of the capture of Cherbourg, reportedly from a heart attack but possibly by suicide by poisoning.
