= Fritz Thiele =

German general and resistance member (1894–1944)

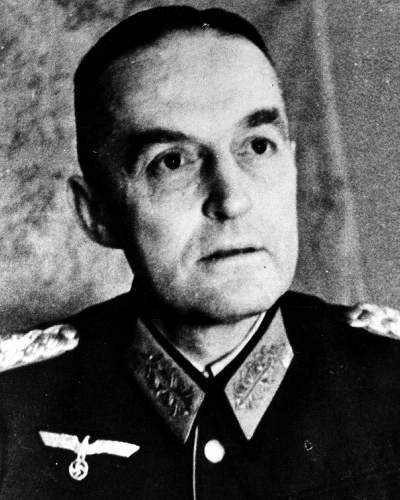
- Thiele in 1943
- Born: 14 April 1894; Berlin, Province of Brandenburg, Kingdom of Prussia, German Empire
- Died: 4 September 1944 (aged 50); Plötzensee Prison, Berlin, German Reich
- Cause of death: Execution by hanging
- Military career
- Allegiance: German Empire; Weimar Republic; Nazi Germany
- Branch: German Army
- Service years: 1914–1944
- Rank: Generalleutnant
- Commands: Chief of the office group armed forces communications at OKW
- Conflicts: World War I World War II
- Awards: Iron Cross, 1st and 2nd class Hanseatic Cross of Hamburg; Imperial Order of the Yoke and Arrows; Order of the Star of Romania; Order of the Cross of Liberty; War Merit Cross, 1st and 2nd class German Cross in Silver

Fritz Thiele (14 April 1894 – 4 September 1944) was a German army general and a member of the German resistance who served as the communications chief of the German Army during World War II.

== Life ==
Thiele was born in Berlin and joined the Imperial German Army in 1914. He served in World War I and was awarded the Iron Cross, 1st and 2nd class, the Hanseatic Cross of Hamburg and the Military Merit Cross of Austria-Hungary, 3rd class with war decoration. At the end of the war, he was an Oberleutnant in Telegraph Battalion 6. He remained in the post-war Reichswehr and went into the signal corps where he became chief of staff of the Inspectorate for Signals in the Reich War Ministry (later, the OKW) from 1936 to 1942. He was promoted to Generalmajor on 1 October 1942, and to Generalleutnant on 1 January 1944.

Working closely with the Chief of Army Communications, General der Nachrichtentruppe Erich Fellgiebel, he was part of the assassination attempt against Adolf Hitler on 20 July 1944. He was responsible as part of the coup attempt in the effort to sever communications between officers loyal to Hitler and armed forces units in the field, and from the communications centre at the Bendlerstrasse in Berlin. He relayed a crucial message from Fellgiebel to General Friedrich Olbricht and the other conspirators that the assassination attempt had failed but the coup attempt should still proceed. There are differing accounts of the time when he provided this report.

Thiele himself did not want to proceed with the coup attempt when he knew that the assassination attempt had failed and he left the Bendlerstrasse and visited Walter Schellenberg at the Reich Central Security Office in an attempt to extricate himself.

== Death ==
Following Fellgiebel's arrest, Thiel was directed to assume his duties before he was himself arrested by the Gestapo on 11 August 1944. He was condemned to death on 21 August 1944 by the Volksgerichtshof and hanged on 4 September 1944 at Plötzensee prison in Berlin.

== See also ==
- Lucy spy ring

== Sources ==
- Plötzensee Prison
- Webb, James Jack (2025). Generals and Admirals of the Third Reich: For Country or Fuehrer. Vol. 3: P–Z. Havertown, PA: Casemate Publishers. ISBN 978-1-952-71518-1.
