= Walter Hennecke =

German admiral

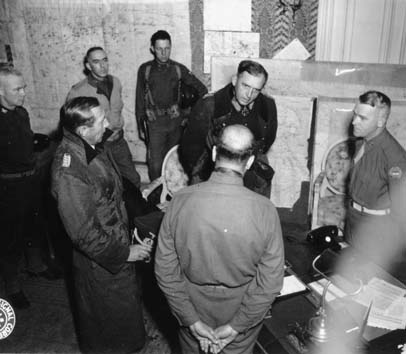
- Walter Hennecke (left) and Karl-Wilhelm von Schlieben surrendering to the American forces at Cherbourg
- Born: 23 May 1898 (German Empire) Betheln
- Died: 1 January 1984 (aged 85); Bad Lippspringe
- Military career
- Allegiance: German Empire (to 1918); Weimar Republic (to 1933); Nazi Germany
- Branch: Imperial German Navy; Reichsmarine; Kriegsmarine
- Service years: 1915–45
- Rank: Konteradmiral
- Units: SMS Freya; SMS Kaiserin
- Commands: cruiser Nürnberg battleship Schleswig-Holstein
- Conflicts: World War I World War II
- Awards: Knight's Cross of the Iron Cross

Walter Hennecke (23 May 1898 – 1 January 1984) was a German admiral during World War II. He was awarded the Knight's Cross of the Iron Cross by Adolf Hitler for "a feat unprecedented in the annals of coastal defense", when he comprehensively damaged Cherbourg Harbour prior to surrendering it to Allied forces.

== Career ==
=== Kaiserliche Marine and Reichsmarine ===
Hennecke entered the Imperial German Navy (crew 15) during the First World War on 2 October 1915, as a seekadett. From 3 October he was at the Marinschule Mürwik and then from 10 November aboard the large cruiser SMS Freya, which was used as a training ship. He served on the battleship SMS Kaiserin from 6 February 1916 to 9 July 1916 and was then transferred to the Marinschule until February 1917. On 13 July 1916, he was promoted to fähnrich zur see. From February 1917 onwards Hennecke became a security officer on a torpedo boat and on 13 December 1917 he was promoted to Lieutenant. He was serving in this role at the end of the war and was quickly released from the navy. From 5 August 1920, Hennecke joined the Provisional Reichsmarine and continued to serve as guardian and Adjutant. In this function, he was promoted to the rank of Oberleutnant zur See on 1 January 1921. From 1 October 1922 to 15 October 1924, Hennecke was a company officer for the defence of the coast, and joined the Technische Hochschule Berlin until 6 September. Hennecke served as a teacher at the Schiffsartillerie- Schule (SAS) in Kiel-Wik until 27 September 1927 . From 30 September 1927, he was commandant of the artillery school ship Delphin and on 1 October 1928 he was promoted to Kapitänleutnant. From 1 October 1929, Hennecke was once again a teacher, this time at the coast artillery school, and from 4 October 1933 onwards, he received a command as an artillery officer on the light cruiser Nürnberg. Hennecke served as a second admiral staff officer from 17 December 1934 onwards on the staff of the Marinestation North Sea. On 1 April 1935 he was promoted to Korvettenkapitän.

=== Kriegsmarine ===
From 5 October 1936 to 4 November 1938 Hennecke was employed as commander of the First Marine Artillery Battalion. He was promoted to Fregattenkapitän on 1 August 1938 and from 2 November 1938 to 30 July 1940 served as first officer on the light cruiser Nürnberg. In November 1938 Hennecke briefly commanded the ship. Hennecke became the first officer on 12 December 1939, after the beginning of the Second World War. He was awarded the clasp of the Iron Cross 2nd Class (EK II) and was promoted to Kapitän zur See on 1 February 1940. On 1 August 1940 Hennecke succeeded Ernst Lindemann as commander of the artillery ship school in Kiel-Wik. After his move on 16 October 1941, he directed the school to Sassnitz until 1 April 1943. In addition, from May to October 1941, he was briefly commander of the former battleship Schleswig-Holstein, used as a cadet training ship. From 2 April 1943, Hennecke had been appointed Commander of the Maritime Defense Normandy. In this service, he was appointed a Konteradmiral on 1 March 1944.

=== Cherbourg ===
On 6 June 1944, Allied troops landed in the Operation Overlord during Hennecke's command. Hennecke remained in Cherbourg-Octeville. The German commander-in-chief West, Gerd von Rundstedt, had foreseen that the city would be an important strategic target for the Allies because of its harbour, and ordered its destruction on 9 June. Hennecke, together with the city commander General-Major Robert Sattler and the harbour commander Kapitän zur See Witt, carried out the complete destruction of the port of Cherbourg, which began on 9 June during the Battle of Cherbourg and only ended immediately before the arrival of Allied troops in the port area on 25 June 1944. After the destruction of the harbour, further military resistance had become meaningless. Hennecke, the commander-in-chief, Lieutenant-General Karl-Wilhelm von Schlieben, and the remaining German defenders surrendered on 29 June to troops of the 9th US infantry division under Major-General Manton S. Eddy in Schlieben's subterranean command bunker in St. Sauveur.

The destruction of the port of Cherbourg was regarded as exemplary by German and Allied observers as the most extensive destruction of a port facility. Hitler was so content with Hennecke's performance that he awarded him the Knight's Cross of the Iron Cross.

=== Captivity ===
Hennecke was first held by US forces, and was transferred on 1 July 1944 to the British prisoner-of-war camp at Trent Park. On 17 April 1947 he was repatriated. Hennecke died on 1 January 1984 in Bad Lippspringe.

== Awards ==
- Iron Cross (1914) 2nd Class (5 March 1922)
- Clasp to the Iron Cross (1939) 2nd Class (12 December 1939) & 1st Class
- High Seas Fleet Badge
- War Merit Cross with Swords 2nd Class & 1st Class
- Knight's Cross of the Iron Cross on 26 June 1944 as Konteradmiral and sea commander of Normandy
