= USS Quentin Walsh =

Guided missile destroyer

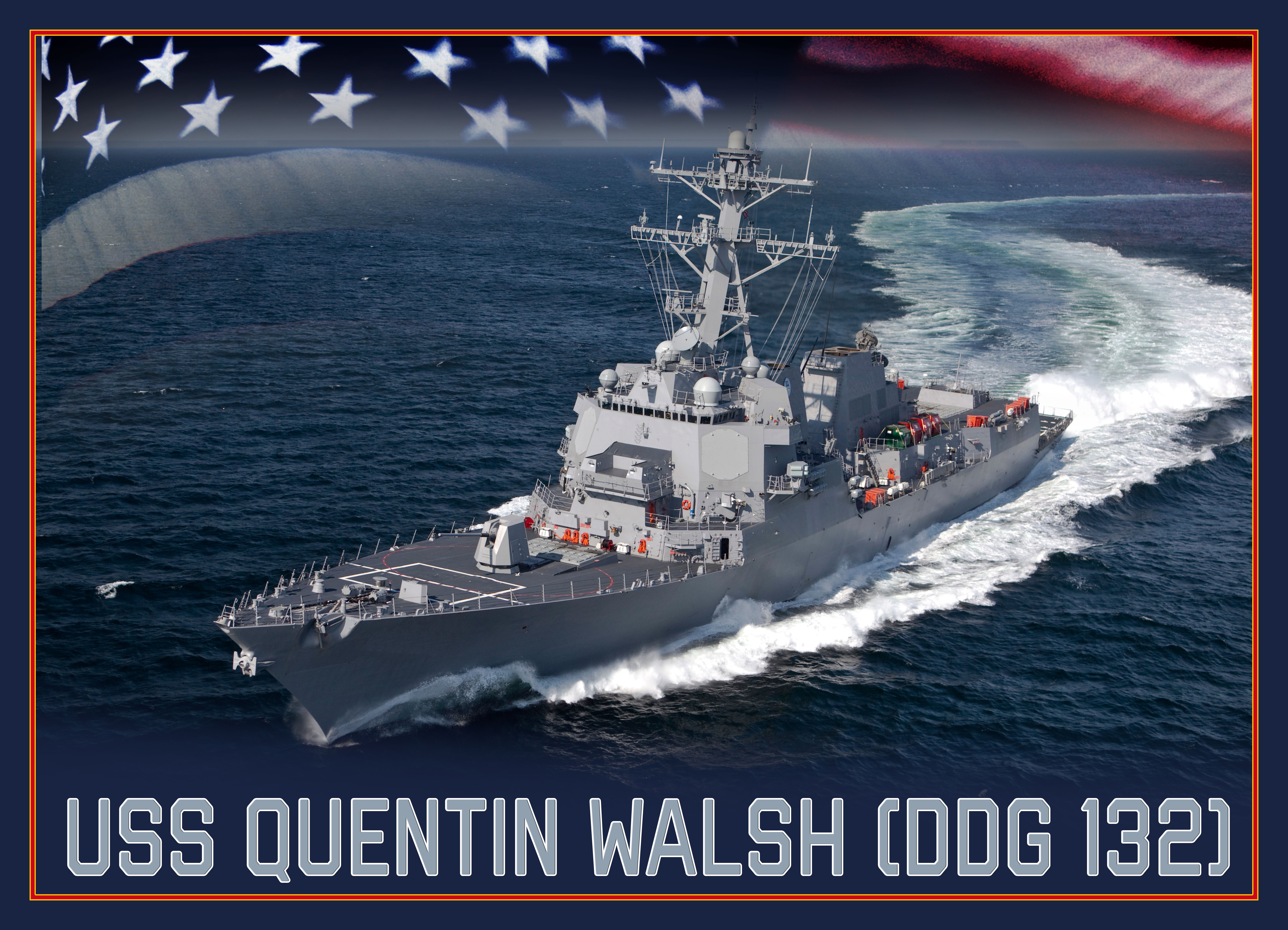
- Graphical depiction of USS Quentin Walsh (DDG-132)

History

United States
- Name: Quentin Walsh
- Namesake: Quentin R. Walsh
- Awarded: 21 December 2018
- Builder: Bath Iron Works
- Laid down: 20 May 2025
- Identification: Hull number: DDG-132
- Status: Under construction

General characteristics
- Class & type: Arleigh Burke-class destroyer
- Displacement: 9,217 tons (full load)
- Length: 510 ft (160 m)
- Beam: 66 ft (20 m)
- Propulsion: 4 × General Electric LM2500 gas turbines 100,000 shp (75,000 kW)
- Speed: 31 knots (57 km/h; 36 mph)
- Complement: 380 officers and enlisted
- Armament: Guns: 1 × 5-inch (127 mm)/62 Mk 45 Mod 4 (lightweight gun); 1 × 20 mm (0.8 in) Phalanx CIWS; 2 × 25 mm (0.98 in) Mk 38 machine gun system; 4 × 0.50 in (12.7 mm) caliber guns; Missiles: 1 × 32-cell, 1 × 64-cell (96 total cells) Mk 41 vertical launching system (VLS): RIM-66M surface-to-air missile; RIM-156 surface-to-air missile; RIM-174A Standard ERAM; RIM-161 anti-ballistic missile; RIM-162 ESSM (quad-packed); BGM-109 Tomahawk cruise missile; RUM-139 vertical launch ASROC; Torpedoes: 2 × Mark 32 triple torpedo tubes: Mark 46 lightweight torpedo; Mark 50 lightweight torpedo; Mark 54 lightweight torpedo
- Armor: Kevlar-type armor with steel hull. Numerous passive survivability measures.
- Aircraft carried: 2 × MH-60R Seahawk helicopters
- Aviation facilities: Double hangar and helipad

USS Quentin Walsh (DDG-132) is a planned Arleigh Burke-class (Flight III) Aegis guided missile destroyer of the United States Navy. She will be named for Captain Quentin Walsh (1910–2000), a United States Coast Guard officer who earned the Navy Cross during the World War II.

== Namesake ==
Then-United States Coast Guard Commander Walsh served on the command staff of US Naval Forces Europe, where he helped draw up plans to seize the strategic port of Cherbourg on the northern edge of Normandy's Cotentin Peninsula during the planning for Operation Overlord. Walsh's plan called for the formation of a specially trained naval reconnaissance unit to determine the condition of the port after its capture. He volunteered to lead the special mission, which after some training arrived off Utah Beach on 9 June 1944, only three days after D-Day.

Walsh's 53-man unit landed and contacted elements of the US Army's 79th Infantry Division, which was engaging the Germans in fierce house-to-house fighting. Allied forces quickly captured the eastern part of the port, while most of the Germans retreated to the western section of the city. Knowing the port was essentially unusable with pockets of resistance remaining, Walsh personally led a 16-member unit of his special task force on a raid to an arsenal area and adjacent waterfront on the western side of the port city. Armed with bazookas, hand grenades, rifles, and submachine guns, he and his party overcame sniper fire and blew open steel doors of underground bunkers, capturing 400 Germans. Walsh and one other officer then approached the German command post at Fort Du Homet under a flag of truce and bluffed its commander into surrendering, capturing a further 350 Germans and liberating 52 American paratroopers being held as prisoners of war. Only then did Walsh begin restoring vital port operations as Port Director. For his actions at Cherbourg, he received the Navy Cross. He later assisted with reconnaissance of the Brittany Peninsula, including the port of Brest, and Le Havre port.

== Construction ==
The start of fabrication ceremony took place at a General Dynamics Bath Iron Works facility in Brunswick, Maine, on 16 November 2021.
