= Quentin R. Walsh =

American Coast Guard officer (1910–2000)

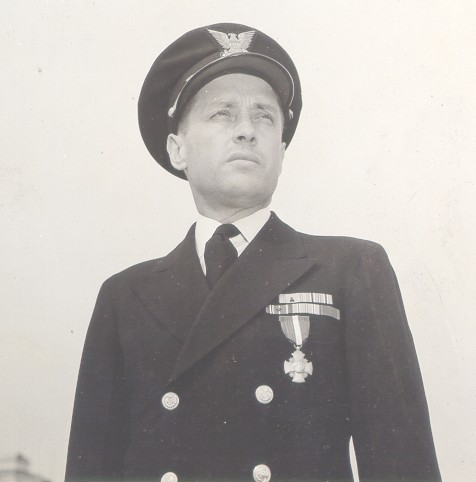
- Born: February 2, 1910; Providence, Rhode Island, U.S.
- Died: May 18, 2000 (aged 90)
- Education: United States Coast Guard Academy
- Military career
- Branch: United States Coast Guard
- Rank: Captain
- Known for: Commanding Officer of a U.S. Navy party reconnoitering and assaulting the naval facilities and naval arsenal at Cherbourg June 26 and 27, 1944

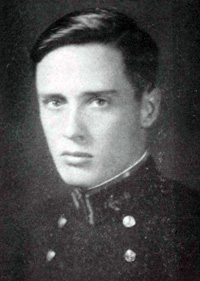
Quentin R. Walsh USCG Academy Photo

Quentin R. Walsh (February 2, 1910 – May 18, 2000) was a United States Coast Guard officer who was decorated for combat leadership during the Battle of Cherbourg and Normandy Campaign in World War II.

== Early life and career ==
Walsh was born on February 2, 1910, in Providence, Rhode Island. He graduated from the U.S. Coast Guard Academy in New London, Connecticut, in 1933. His initial assignments involved serving on Coast Guard cutters that captured "rum runners" between Cuba and Nova Scotia. In the late 1930s, Walsh spent a year observing a whaling factory ship, covering 30,000 miles from Sweden to Australia, the Indian Ocean, and Antarctica. He produced a detailed three-volume report on modern open-sea whaling, which the Commerce Department references in its stance against commercial whaling.

== World War II ==
Then-Commander Walsh served on the command staff of U.S. Naval Forces Europe, where he helped draw up plans to seize the strategic port of Cherbourg on the northern edge of Normandy's Cotentin Peninsula during the planning for Operation Overlord. Walsh's plan called for the formation of a specially trained naval reconnaissance unit to determine the condition of the port after its capture. He volunteered to lead the special mission, which after some training arrived off Utah Beach on June 9, 1944, only three days after D-Day.

Walsh's 53-man unit landed and contacted elements of the U.S. Army's 79th Infantry Division, which was engaging the Germans in fierce house-to-house fighting. Allied forces quickly captured the eastern part of the port, while most of the Germans retreated to the western section of the city. Knowing the port was essentially unusable with pockets of resistance remaining, Walsh personally led a 16-member unit of his special task force on a raid to an arsenal area and adjacent waterfront on the western side of the port city. Armed with bazookas, hand grenades, rifles, and submachine guns, he and his party overcame sniper fire and blew open steel doors of underground bunkers, capturing 400 Germans. Walsh and one other officer then approached the German command post at Fort Du Homet under a flag of truce and bluffed its commander into surrendering, capturing a further 350 Germans and liberating 52 American paratroopers being held as prisoners of war. Only then did Walsh begin restoring vital port operations as Port Director. For his actions at Cherbourg, he received the Navy Cross.

He later assisted with reconnaissance of the Brittany Peninsula, including the port of Brest, and Le Havre port.

Walsh returned to the United States in October, 1944 due to emphysema he contracted while stationed in England and was subsequently medically retired.

== Later career and life ==
Walsh was recalled to duty during the Korean War, serving at Coast Guard Headquarters in Washington, D.C., until he retired again in 1960. He settled in Denton, Maryland, a small rural community in Caroline County, and taught science classes at North Caroline High School from 1960 to 1965. He then served as a Maryland parole and probation officer until retiring in 1975. He was known in Denton for his community activism to preserve its historic district. Walsh died in 2000.

== Navy Cross citation ==
Walsh received the Navy Cross for his actions on 26 and 27 June 1944, while commanding a U.S. Naval Reconnaissance Party assigned to reconnoiter the naval facilities and arsenal at Cherbourg, France. According to the citation, Walsh led his party through the eastern half of the city, engaging in street fighting and advancing through scattered pockets of resistance still under hostile fire. He accepted the surrender of approximately 400 enemy personnel at the Naval Arsenal and disarmed them, and subsequently received the surrender of another 350 officers and men. In the course of the operation, he freed 52 U.S. Army paratroopers who had been held prisoner in the fort.

== Ship namesake ==
USS Quentin Walsh (DDG-132) is a planned United States Navy Arleigh Burke-class Flight III guided missile destroyer and will be the 82nd overall for the class.
