= Karl Freiherr von Thüngen =

German general (1893–1944)

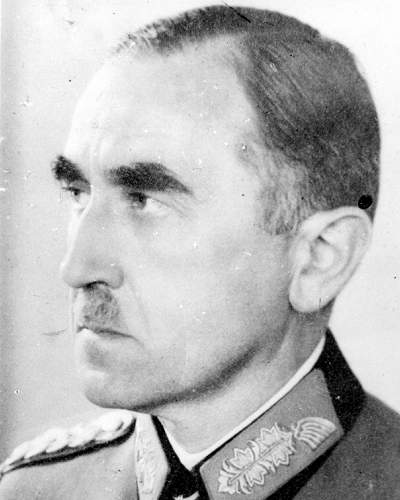
- Born: 26 June 1893; Mainz, German Empire
- Died: 24 October 1944 (aged 51); Brandenburg-Görden Prison, Free State of Prussia, Nazi Germany
- Cause of death: Execution by firing squad
- Military career
- Allegiance: Nazi Germany
- Branch: Wehrmacht
- Rank: Generalleutnant
- Commands: 18th Panzer Division
- Conflicts: World War I World War II
- Awards: Knight's Cross of the Iron Cross

Karl Freiherr von Thüngen (26 June 1893 – 24 October 1944) was a German general in the Wehrmacht during World War II who was executed in 1944 after the failed 20 July Plot.

== Biography ==
During World War I, Thungen served in the Bavarian Army. He was later awarded both classes of the Iron Cross.

During World War II, Thüngen served on the Eastern Front, in 1942 and 1943 with the 18th Panzer Division, which committed numerous war crimes during his command. The division shot any enemy soldier who was not clearly identified as a soldier, as well as any civilian who was suspected of supporting partisans. Escaping Soviet citizens were systematically handed over to the secret military police, who executed them as spies. Prisoners of war were starved and forced to walk long distances. They also carried out looting on such a great scale that civilians starved. Troops killed livestock for sport and carried out armed robberies, for which they were not punished.

On 6 April 1943 he was awarded the Knight's Cross of the Iron Cross. On 20 July 1944, he was appointed by the conspirators as the commander of the defense group III (Berlin), succeeding the arrested General Joachim von Kortzfleisch. He did not follow the conspirators' orders and later took part in the interrogation of Major Hans-Ulrich von Oertzen, a supporter of the plot under his command.

Thüngen was nevertheless subsequently arrested by the Gestapo. He was tried under German military law and dismissed from the army by the court of honor and was then tried by the People's Court, sentenced to death by Roland Freisler on 5 October 1944 and shot by firing squad in Brandenburg-Görden Prison on 24 October 1944.

== Family ==
Karl Freiherr von Thüngen was the son of Karl Ernst Freiherr von Thüngen (1839–1927) and Eva Elisabeth Maier (born 1874). He was married twice. His first marriage took place on 11 February 1919 to Margit Edle von Schultes (dead 1932). On 5 April 1934 he married Marie Freiin von Michel-Raulino (1893–1978). Karl Freiherr Michel von Tüßling was her cousin.

== Awards and decorations ==
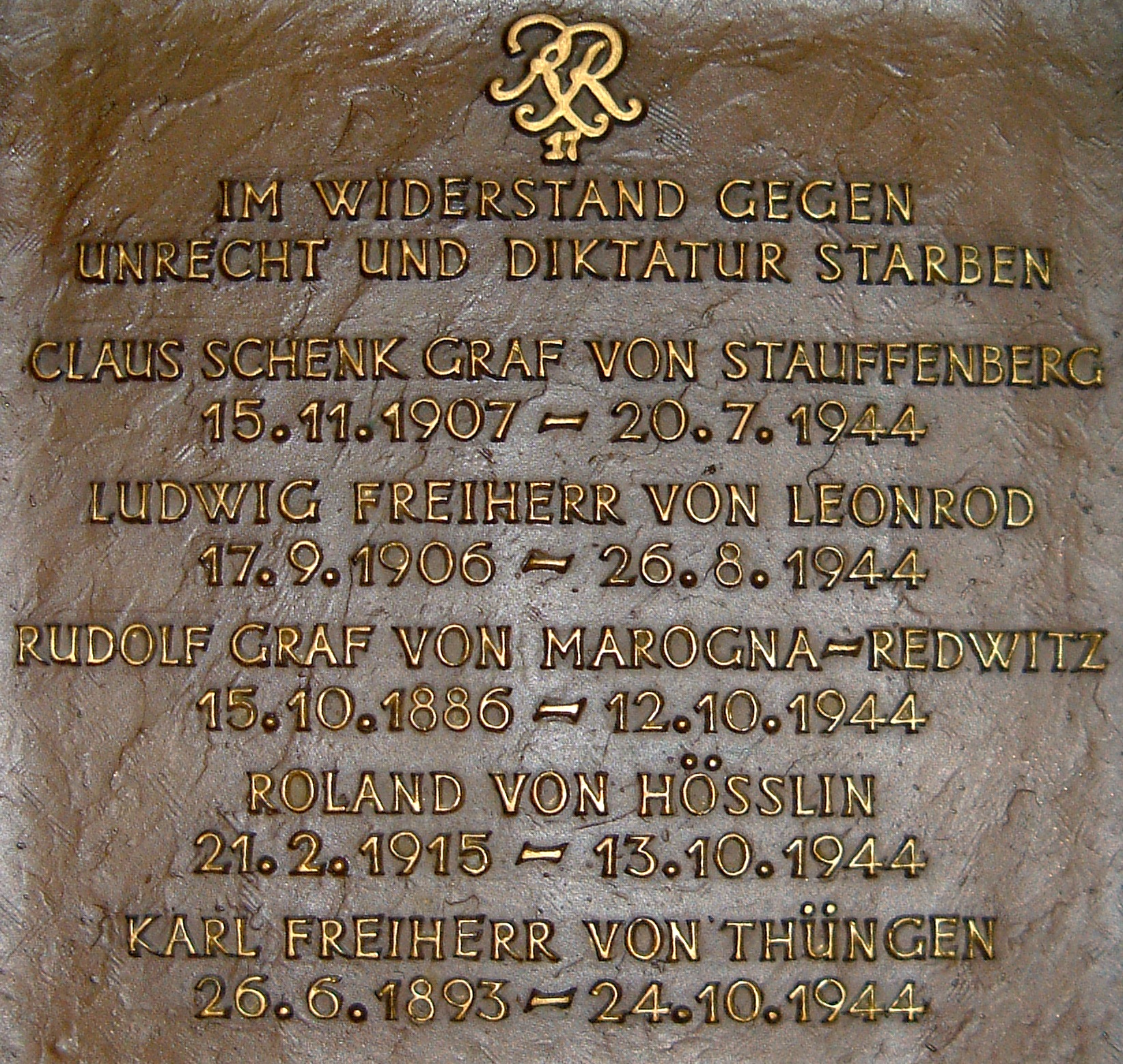
Bamberg Cathedral: a plaque commemorates the five "Bamberg Troopers"

- Iron Cross (1914)
  - 2nd Class
  - 1st Class
- German Cross in Gold (18 October 1941)
- Knight's Cross of the Iron Cross on 6 April 1943 as Generalleutnant and commander of 18. Panzer-Division

Military offices
Preceded by General der Panzertruppe Walther Nehring	Commander of 18. Panzer-Division; 26 January 1942 – July 1942	Succeeded by General der Nachrichtentruppen Albert Praun
Preceded by General der Nachrichtentruppen Albert Praun	Commander of 18. Panzer-Division; 24 August 1942 – 15 September 1942	Succeeded by Generalleutnant Erwin Menny
Preceded by Generalleutnant Erwin Menny	Commander of 18. Panzer-Division; February 1943 – 1 April 1943	Succeeded by Generalleutnant Karl-Wilhelm von Schlieben
