= Hans-Ulrich von Oertzen =

WWII German officer

Hans Ulrich von Oertzen
- Born: 6 March 1915; Berlin, Germany
- Died: 21 July 1944 (aged 29); Berlin, Germany
- Cause of death: Suicide
- Military career
- Allegiance: Germany
- Branch: Wehrmacht
- Rank: Major (Major)
- Commands: Liaison officer to the commander of the defense group III (Berlin)
- Conflicts: World War II

Major Hans Ulrich von Oertzen (6 March 1915 – 21 July 1944) was a German officer who served in Army Group Centre of the Wehrmacht during the Second World War. He took part in the military-based 20 July Plot conspiracy against Adolf Hitler and many letters to his wife have been published that provide an insight into his thoughts during that period.

== Life ==
Born in Berlin to an aristocratic family, Oertzen followed his father into the army and trained as a general staff officer. During the Second World War he was promoted to major and by 1943 was serving in Army Group Centre under Generalmajor Henning von Tresckow, who was one of the leading members of the resistance. He then helped Claus von Stauffenberg to develop Operation Valkyrie. On 26 March 1944, he married Ingrid von Langenn-Steinkeller, and a selection of 240 letters he wrote to her from 1942 to 1944 were recently published in book form in Germany.

== 20 July plot ==
On 20 July 1944 von Oertzen was the liaison officer to the commander of the defense group III (Berlin) and passed on the first Valkyrie orders. After the failure of the coup attempt, he was arrested and interrogated by General Joachim von Kortzfleisch and Generalleutnant Karl Freiherr von Thüngen, who himself was later executed as a member of the plot. There was no evidence of complicity in the plot until the next morning when a secretary reported having seen him with Stauffenberg. With the arrival of the Gestapo imminent he killed himself by detonating two hand grenades.
