= 18th Panzer Division =

German army division during World War II

- 18. Panzer-Division
- Unit insignia
- Active: 1940–43
- Country: Germany
- Branch: Army
- Type: Panzer
- Role: Armoured warfare
- Size: Division
- Garrison/HQ: Chemnitz
- Engagements: World War II; Operation Barbarossa; Battle of Kursk

Commanders
- Notable commanders: Walther Nehring

The 18th Panzer Division (German: 18. Panzer-Division) was a German World War II armoured division that fought on the Eastern Front from 1941 until its disbandment in 1943.

== Formation ==
The 18th Panzer Division was formed on 26 October 1940 at Chemnitz from parts of the 4th Infantry Division, 14th Infantry Division, and four battalions of submersible tanks. They had originally been intended for Operation Sea Lion (Seelöwe), the planned German invasion of United Kingdom. Of these four tank battalions, two formed the 18th Panzer Regiment and the other two the 28th Panzer Regiment of the 18th Panzer Division. In March 1941 the 18th Panzer Division was reorganized, the 28th Panzer Regiment was disbanded, one of its battalions became the third battalion of the 18th Panzer Regiment, the other battalion was transferred to the 3rd Panzer Division.

== Service ==
The 18th Panzer Division first saw action during the German invasion of the Soviet Union, Operation Barbarossa, on 22 June 1941. The 18th Panzer Division fought as part of XLVII Panzer Corps, and over the next six months was involved in seizing Smolensk and Bryansk and the assault on Tula. The division suffered heavy losses in the first month of the war, losing half its tanks and a third of its manpower in June and July. With the start of the Soviet counter offensive in December 1941 the 18th Panzer Division was driven back to Oryol with heavy losses.

In the summer of 1942, the 18th Panzer Division took part in the initial drive on Stalingrad, but was soon transferred to the central section of the front. The 18th Panzer Division took part in security warfare in the spring of 1943. In the summer of 1943, the division fought in the Battle of Kursk, and suffered heavy losses. After Kursk the 18th Panzer-Division suffered from poor morale and frequent desertions and was disbanded, with the division's personnel being used to build the 18th Artillery Division.

== War crimes ==
According to Omer Bartov, the 18th Panzer Division was heavily engaged in the looting of food from Soviet civilians to the point that the latter starved to death. At the beginning of the invasion orders were given to execute wounded Soviet soldiers as these were seen as an unnecessary burden. In "bandit-fighting" operations, the division command gave out orders to shoot anybody suspected of supporting alleged partisans. Within the division, harsh measures were employed against any soldier found guilty of dissent or reluctant to fight, leading to a number of executions.

== Organization ==
Organization of the division:

- Headquarters
- 18th Panzer Regiment
- 52nd Panzergrenadier Regiment
- 101st Panzergrenadier Regiment
- 88th Panzer Artillery Regiment
- 18th Motorcycle Battalion
- 88th Panzer Reconnaissance Battalion
- 88th Tank Destroyer Battalion
- 209th Panzer Engineer Battalion
- 88th Panzer Signal Battalion
- 88th Panzer Divisional Supply Group

== Commanding officers ==
The commander of the division:

- General der Panzertruppen Walther Nehring, 26 October 1940
- Generalleutnant Karl Freiherr von Thüngen, 26 January 1942
- General der Nachrichtentruppen Albert Praun, July 1942
- Generalleutnant Karl Freiherr von Thüngen, 24 August 1942
- Generalleutnant Erwin Menny, 15 September 1942
- Generalleutnant Karl Freiherr von Thüngen, February 1943
- Generalleutnant Karl-Wilhelm von Schlieben, 1 April 1943
