= Karl-Wilhelm von Schlieben =

General in the Wehrmacht

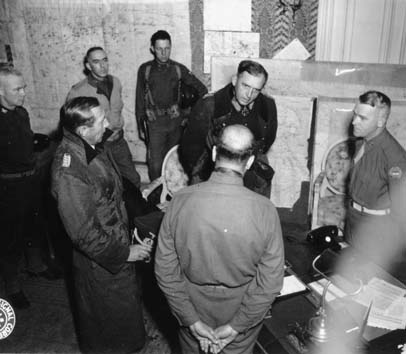
- Schlieben and Walter Hennecke at the surrender of Cherbourg
- Born: 30 October 1894; Eisenach
- Died: 18 June 1964 (aged 69); Giessen
- Military career
- Allegiance: German Empire; Weimar Republic; Nazi Germany
- Branch: German Army
- Service years: 1914–1945
- Rank: Generalleutnant
- Commands: 208th Infantry Division; 18th Panzer Division; 709th Infantry Division
- Conflicts: World War I World War II

Karl-Wilhelm von Schlieben (30 October 1894 – 18 June 1964) was a German general in the Wehrmacht during World War II.

== Biography ==
Schlieben joined the Prussian Army in August 1914 and served during World War I. He served as a regimental commander with the 1st Panzer Division during the Battle of France in 1940. He then served as a brigade commander with the 4th Panzer Division on the Eastern Front from June 1942. In February 1943, Schlieben briefly took command of the 208th Infantry Division, before being transferred to the 18th Panzer Division in April, again as division commander.

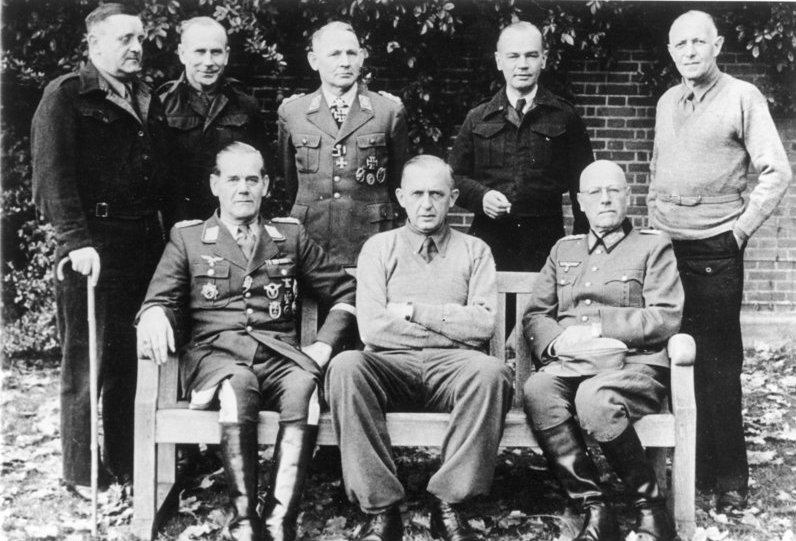
At Trent Park, von Schlieben was in the middle in the front row

Following the Battle of Kursk, the division was disbanded, and in December 1943, he was given command of the 709th Static Infantry Division, based in Normandy, France. The unit was used for occupation duties in France. The division was on the Normandy coast when the Allied invasion took place, and thus fought in the early days of the Battle of Normandy, quickly becoming trapped in the Cotentin Peninsula. As U.S. forces sealed off the peninsula, the remnants of the division fell back on Cherbourg.

On 23 June 1944, Schlieben was appointed commandant of Cherbourg, which the German high command had designated as a 'fortress'. Three days later, von Schlieben and over 800 other troops surrendered to Major General Manton S. Eddy, the commander of the U.S. 9th Infantry Division. He was held at Trent Park before he was transferred to Island Farm on 9 August 1945. He was released on 7 October 1947. Schlieben died on 18 June 1964 in Gießen.

== Sources ==
- Gordon A.Harrison, Cross Channel Attack
- Jorge Rosado & Chris Bishop, German Wehrmacht Panzer Divisions
- John Keegan, Six Armies in Normandy

Military offices
Preceded by Generalleutnant Karl Freiherr von Thüngen	Commander of 18. Panzer-Division; 1 April 1943 – 1 December 1943	Succeeded by renamed 18. Artillerie-Division
