= 277th Infantry Division =

- 277. Infanterie-Division
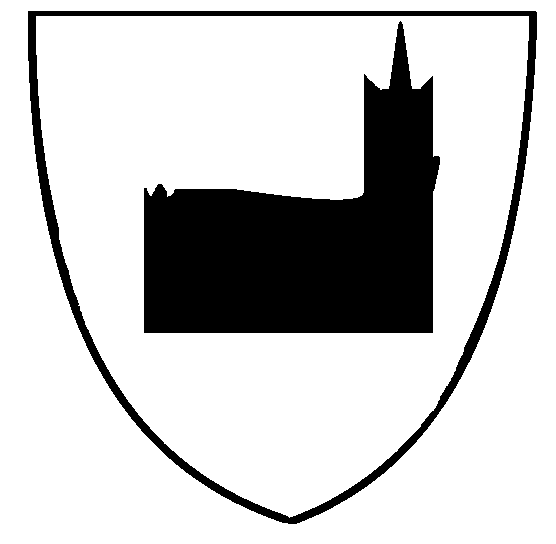
- 277. Infanterie Division Vehicle Insignia
- Active: 22 May 1940 – 1945
- Country: Nazi Germany
- Branch: Army
- Type: Infantry
- Size: Division
- Engagements: World War II: Normandy Campaign; Battle of the Bulge

A first 277th Infantry Division (German: 277. Infanterie-Division) was ordered to form on May 22, 1940, as part of the 10th mobilisation wave (10. Welle), but this order was rescinded after the French Surrender. A new 277th Infantry Division was formed in Croatia on November 17, 1943, as part of the 22nd mobilisation wave (22. Welle), the division was destroyed in the Battle of Normandy in August 1944. A third, 277th Volksgrenadier Division (277. Volksgrenadier-Division) was formed on September 4, 1944, in Hungary by redesignation of the newly formed 574th Volksgrenadier Division (574. Volksgrenadier-Division) of the 32nd mobilisation wave (32. Welle). In 1945 the division entered U.S. captivity in the Ruhr Pocket.

== Operational history ==
The 277th Infantry Division was assigned to 2nd Panzer Army from early December 1943 until late January 1944, having been placed there after pressure by Oberbefehlshaber Südost on OKW to strengthen the 2nd Panzer Army with additional forces. The addition of forces was intended to reverse gains made by the National Liberation Army since the announcement of the Armistice of Cassibile on 8 September 1943, after which the Royal Italian Army had largely ceased fighting against the Yugoslav partisans.

After its time in Croatia and Hungary, the 277th Infantry Division spent its entire operation history on the Western front. The division took part in the Battles of Normandy (where it was practically destroyed), and after reconstitution, the Lorraine campaign under Army Group G, beginning in November 1944. It then participated in the Ardennes campaign. It fought alongside the 12th VG Division in the effort to take Rocherath-Krinkelt and Elsenborn.

== Organization ==
=== 1943 ===
- Grenadier-Regiment 989, I and II Battalions
- Grenadier-Regiment 990, I and II Battalions
- Grenadier-Regiment 991, I and II Battalions
- Artillerie-Regiment 277, I-IV Battalions
- Divisions-Füsilier-Abteilung 277
- Pionier-Battalion 277
- Infanterie-Divisions-Nachrichten-Abteilung 277
- Feldersatz-Battalion 277

=== 1944 ===
- Grenadier-Regiment 989, I and II Battalions
- Grenadier-Regiment 990, I and II Battalions
- Grenadier-Regiment 991, I and II Battalions
- Artillerie-Regiment 277, I-IV Battalions
- Divisions-Füsilier-Kompanie 277
- Panzer-Jäger-Abteilung 277
- Pionier-Battalion 277
- Infanterie-Divisions-Nachrichten-Abteilung 277

== Literature ==
- Tessin, Georg. Verbände und Truppen der deutschen Wehrmacht und Waffen-SS 1939 - 1945 Volume 8
