= Erich Fellgiebel =

German general (1886–1944)

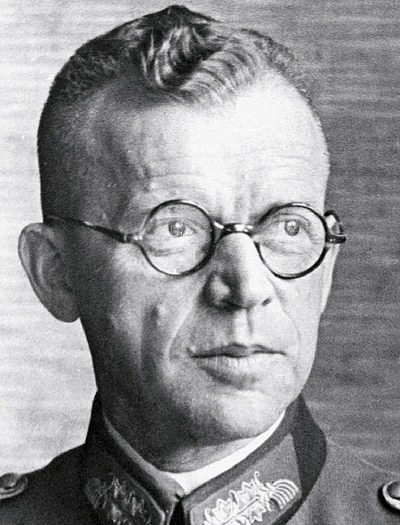
- Born: Fritz Erich Fellgiebel; 4 October 1886; Pöpelwitz, Silesia, Prussia, Germany
- Died: 4 September 1944 (aged 57); Plötzensee Prison, Berlin, Nazi Germany
- Relatives: Walther-Peer Fellgiebel (son)
- Military career
- Allegiance: German Empire; Weimar Republic; Nazi Germany
- Branch: German Army
- Service years: 1905–1944
- Rank: General der Nachrichtentruppe
- Commands: Chief of Wehrmacht communications Chief of Army communications
- Conflicts: World War I World War II

Fritz Erich Fellgiebel (4 October 1886 – 4 September 1944) was a German Army general of signals and a resistance fighter, participating in both the 1938 September Conspiracy to topple dictator Adolf Hitler and the Nazi Party, and the 1944 20 July plot to assassinate Hitler. In 1929, Fellgiebel became head of the cipher bureau (German: Chiffrierstelle) of the Ministry of the Reichswehr, which would later become the OKW/Chi. He was a signals specialist and was instrumental in introducing a common enciphering machine, the Enigma machine. However, he was unsuccessful in promoting a single cipher agency to coordinate all operations, as was demanded by OKW/Chi and was still blocked by Joachim von Ribbentrop, Heinrich Himmler and Hermann Göring until autumn 1943. It was not achieved until General Albert Praun took over the post following Fellgiebel's arrest and execution for his role in the 20 July attempted coup.

== Military career ==
Fellgiebel was born in Pöpelwitz (Present-day Popowice in Wrocław, Poland) in the Prussian Province of Silesia. At the age of 18, he joined a signals battalion in the Prussian Army as an officer cadet. During the First World War, he served as a captain on the General Staff. After the war, he was assigned to Berlin as a General Staff officer of the Reichswehr. His service had been exemplary, and in 1928 he was promoted to the rank of major.

Fellgiebel was promoted lieutenant colonel on 1 February 1933 and became a full colonel (Oberst) on 1 February 1935.

By 1938, he was a major general. That year, he was appointed Chief of the Army's Signal Establishment and Chief of the Wehrmacht's communications liaison to the Supreme Command (OKW). Fellgiebel became General der Nachrichtentruppe (General of the Communications Troops) on 1 August 1940.

In 1942, Fellgiebel was promoted to Chief Signal Officer of Army High Command and of Supreme Command of Armed Forces (German: Chef des Heeresnachrichtenwesens), a position he held until 1944 when he was arrested and executed for his key role in the 20 July plot to assassinate Hitler.

Fellgiebel was one of the first to understand that the German military should adopt and use the Enigma encryption machine. As head of Hitler's signal services, Fellgiebel knew every military secret, including Wernher von Braun's rocketry work at the Peenemünde Army Research Center. Hitler needed Fellgiebel's expertise, but did not fully trust him because he considered Fellgiebel too independent-minded.

== Resistance activities ==
Through his acquaintance with Colonel General Ludwig Beck, his superior, and then Beck's successor, Colonel-General Franz Halder, Fellgiebel contacted the anti-Nazi resistance group in the Wehrmacht armed forces. In the 1938 September Conspiracy to topple Hitler and the Nazi party on the eve of the Munich Agreement, he was supposed to cut communications throughout Germany while Field Marshal Erwin von Witzleben would occupy Berlin.

He was a key source for the Red Orchestra. Fellgiebel released classified German military information to Rudolf Roessler (codename "Lucy" of the Lucy spy ring) about Operation Citadel which allowed Soviet forces to deploy effectively.

Fellgiebel was involved in the preparations for Operation Valkyrie and during the attempt on the Führer's life on 20 July 1944 tried to cut Hitler's headquarters at the Wolf's Lair in East Prussia off from all telecommunication connections. He only partly succeeded, as he could not prevent the informing of Joseph Goebbels in Berlin via separate SS links. When it became clear that the attempt had failed, Fellgiebel had to override the communications black-out he had set up. Fellgiebel's most famous act that day was his telephone report to his co-conspirator General Fritz Thiele at the Bendlerblock, after he was informed that Hitler was still alive: "Etwas Furchtbares ist passiert! Der Führer lebt!" ("Something awful has happened! The Führer lives!").

Fellgiebel was arrested immediately at the Wolf's Lair and tortured for three weeks but did not reveal any names of his co-conspirators. He was charged before the Volksgerichtshof ("People's Court"). On 10 August 1944, he was found guilty by Roland Freisler and sentenced to death. He was executed on 4 September 1944 at Plötzensee Prison in Berlin.

== Memorials ==
In Pöcking (Bavaria), Bundeswehr barracks is named General-Fellgiebel-Kaserne (de:General-Fellgiebel-Kaserne) in his honour.

== Awards and decorations ==
- Iron Cross of 1914, 1st and 2nd class
- Clasp to the Iron Cross, 1st and 2nd class
- Honour Cross of the World War 1914/1918
- Ottoman War Medal (Turkish: Harp Madalyası, "Gallipoli Star" or "Iron Crescent ")
- Military Merit Order, 4th class with Swords (Bavaria)
- Military Merit Cross, 3rd class with War Decoration (Austria-Hungary)
- Officer's Cross of the Order of Military Merit (Bulgaria)

== See also ==
- List of members of the 20 July plot
- Lucy spy ring

== Literature ==
- Anthony Cave Brown, Bodyguard of Lies, Harper & Row, 1975.
- Kenneth Macksey: Without Enigma: the Ultra & Fellgiebel riddles. Shepperton: Allan, 2000. – ISBN 0-7110-2766-8.
- Alexander Stahlberg (de), Bounden Duty: The Memoirs of a German Officer 1932-45, 1990.
- Wildhagen, Karl Heinz (Hrsg.): Erich Fellgiebel, Meister operativer Nachrichtenverbindungen. – Wenningsen: Selbstverlag, 1970.

== Sources ==
- Account of the Operation (in German)
- Linked German article
- Brief article about Fellgiebel
