= General der Nachrichtentruppe =

WW2 German Army branch general rank

General of the Communications Troops General der Nachrichtentruppe
- Arabesque and flecktarn suit insignia

- Army shoulder board
- Country: Nazi Germany
- Service branch: German Army
- Rank: Three-star
- NATO rank code: OF-8
- Non-NATO rank: O-9
- Formation: 1935
- Abolished: 1945
- Next higher rank: Generaloberst
- Next lower rank: Generalleutnant
- Equivalent ranks: See list

General der Nachrichtentruppe (Literally: General of the Communications Troops) was a General of the branch OF8-rank of German Army, introduced by the Wehrmacht in 1940.

The rank was equivalent to the long established General der Kavallerie, General der Artillerie and General der Infanterie. The Wehrmacht also introduced General der Gebirgstruppe (mountain troops), General der Pioniere (engineers), General der Flieger (aviators), General der Fallschirmtruppe (parachute troops) and General der Panzertruppe (armored troops).

Only two officers held the rank; Erich Fellgiebel (1886-1944) from 1 August 1940 until his dismissal following the 20 July Plot assassination attempt and Albert Praun (1894-1975) who was appointed on 1 October 1944 and served until he was taken into captivity in May 1945.

junior Rank; Generalleutnant	(German officer rank); General der Nachrichtentruppe	senior Rank; Generaloberst

== See also ==
- General (Germany)
- Comparative officer ranks of World War II
