= Rudolf Rössler =

Rudolf Rössler may refer to:

- Rudolf Roessler, Protestant German anti-Nazi
- Rudolf Rössler (painter), Austrian painter and illustrator
