= Rudolf Rössler (painter) =

Austrian painter (1864–1934)

Rudolf Rössler (1864–1934) was an Austrian painter and illustrator.

== Life ==
Rudolf Rössler was born in Gablonz, Bohemia (then part of Austria-Hungary), on 28 April 1864. He was known as a painter of genre scenes. He taught at the Vienna College of Applied Arts. He died in Vienna on 16 October 1934, aged seventy.

== Gallery ==
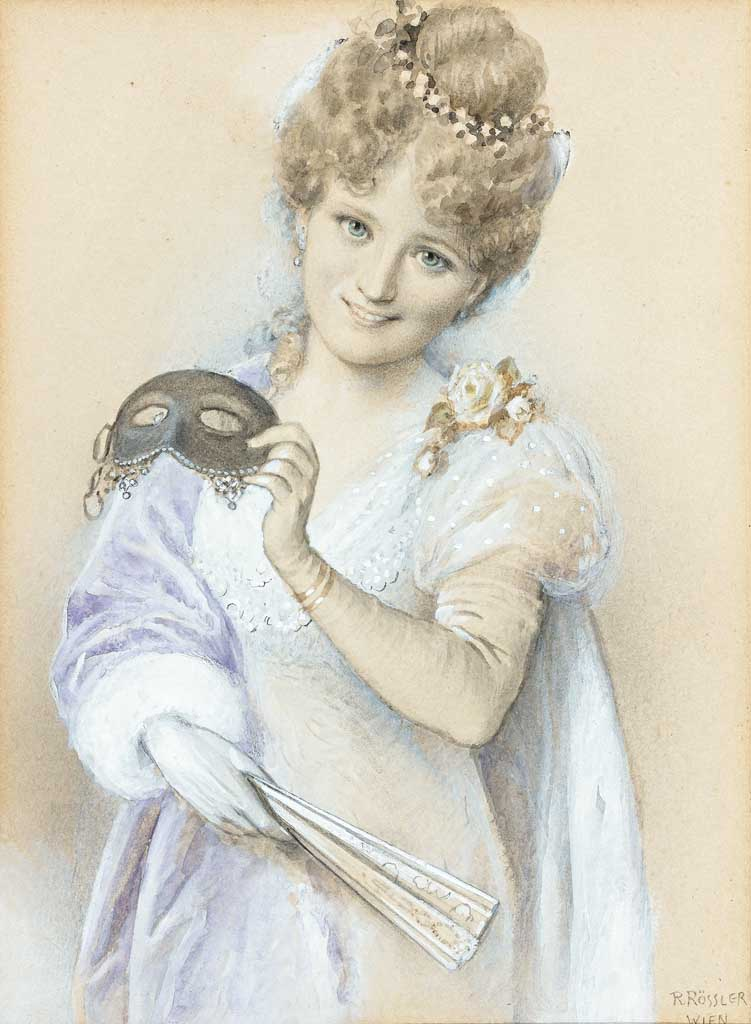
Dame mit Maske

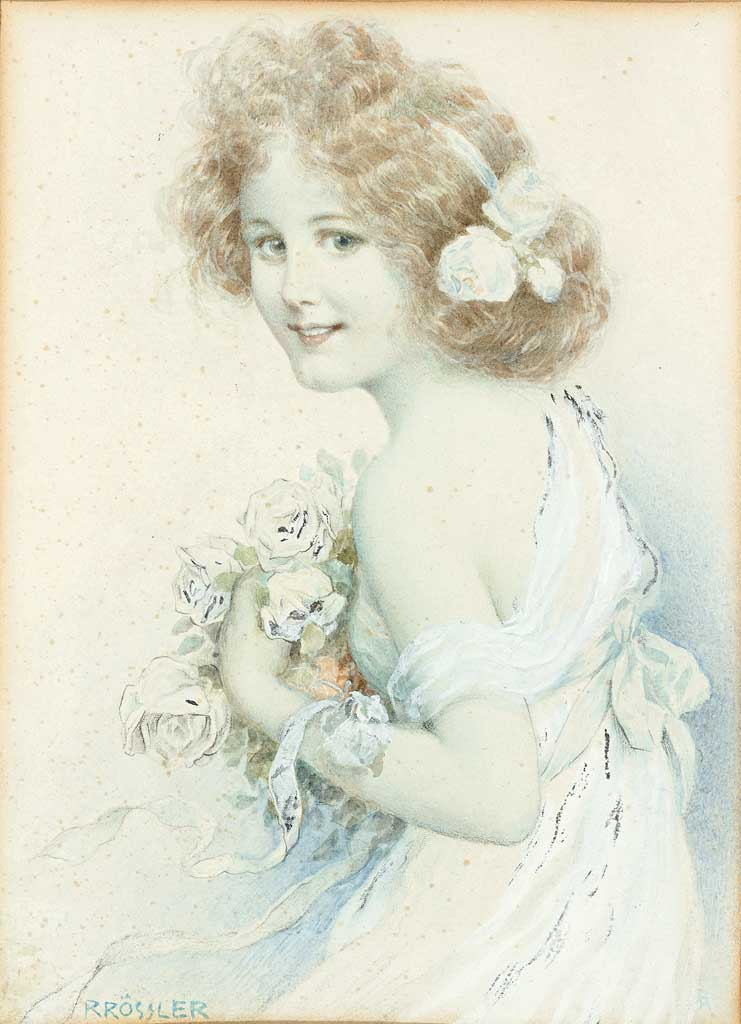
Mädchenportrait mit Rosenstrauß

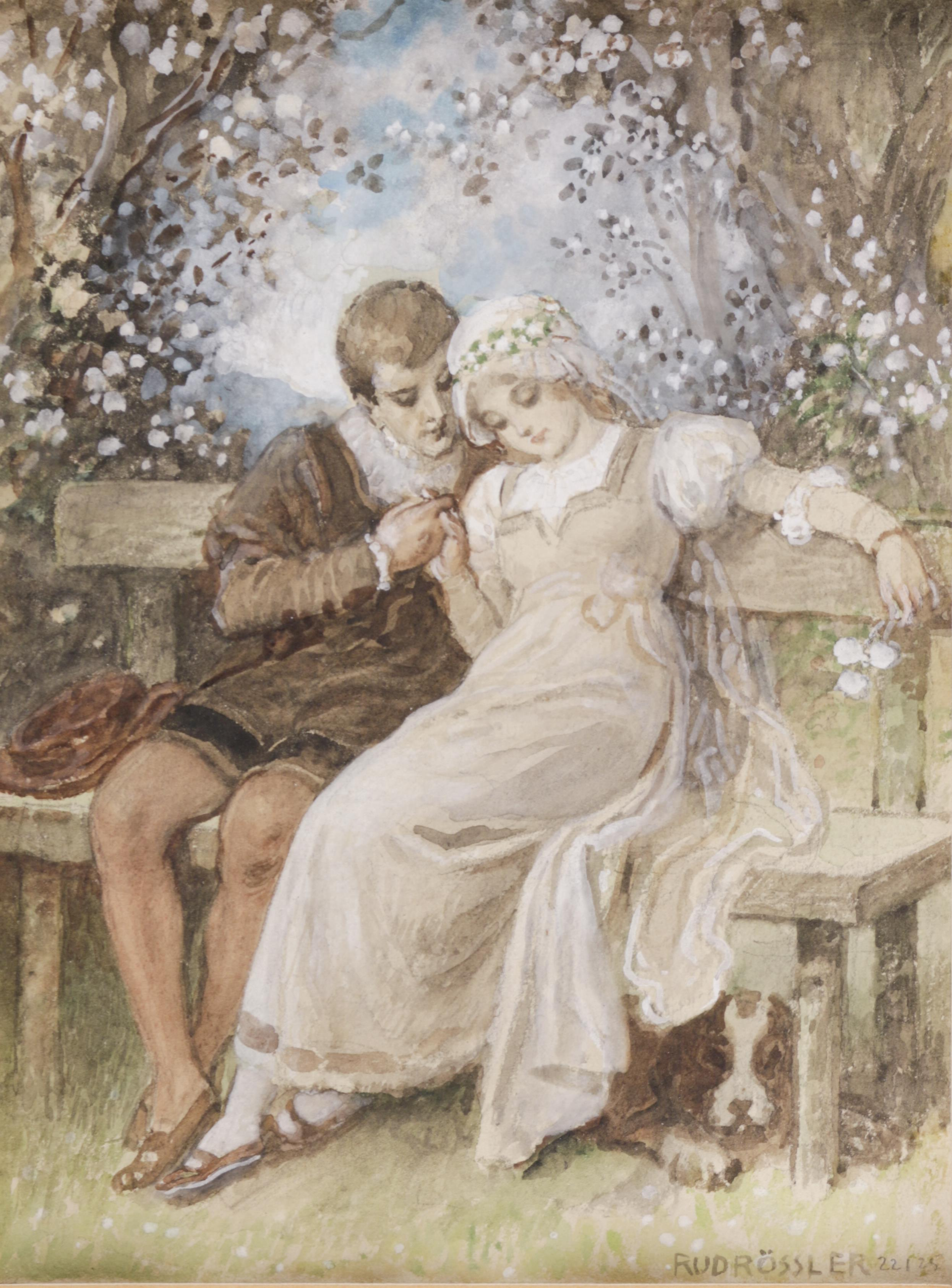
Liebespaar in mittelalterlicher Tracht

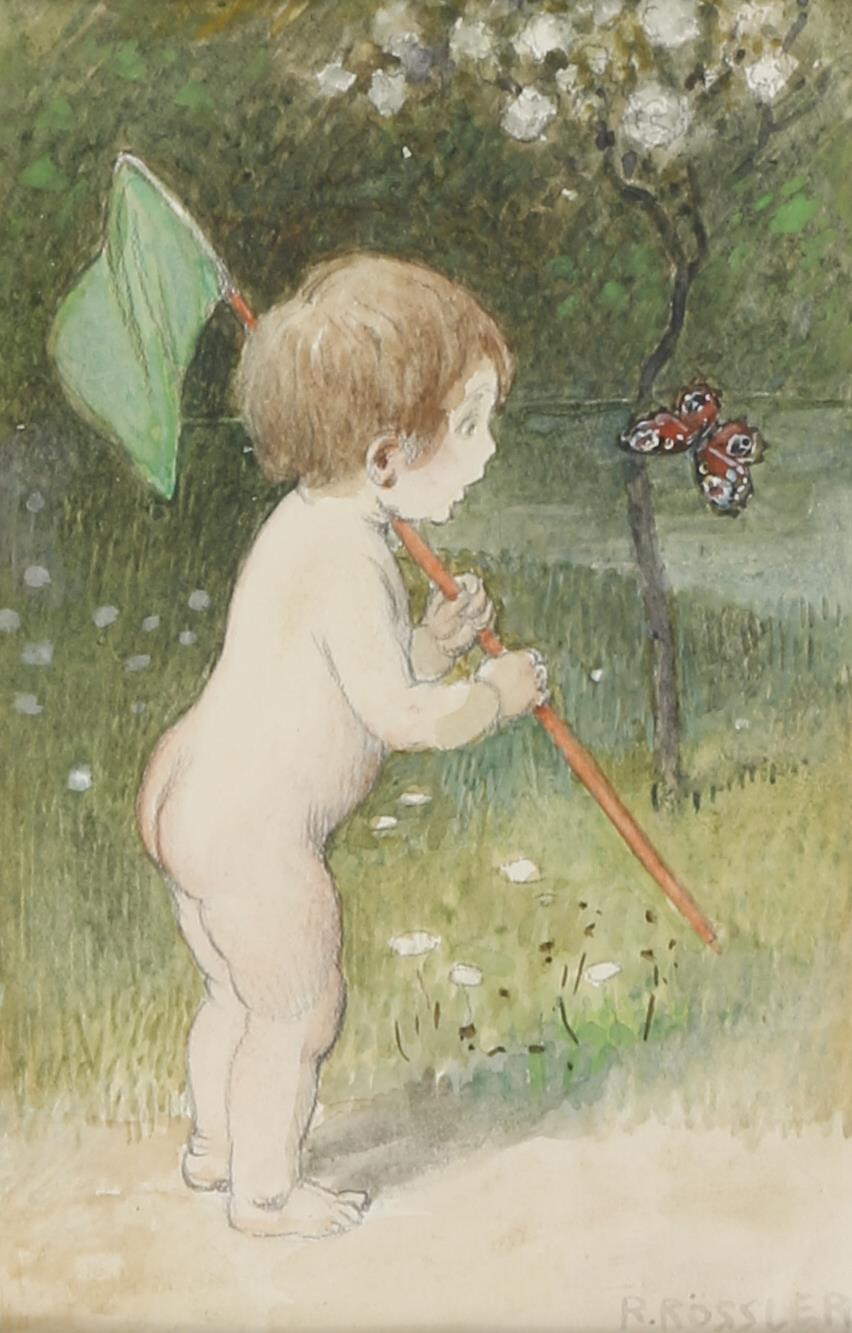
Kind beim Schmetterlingsfangen

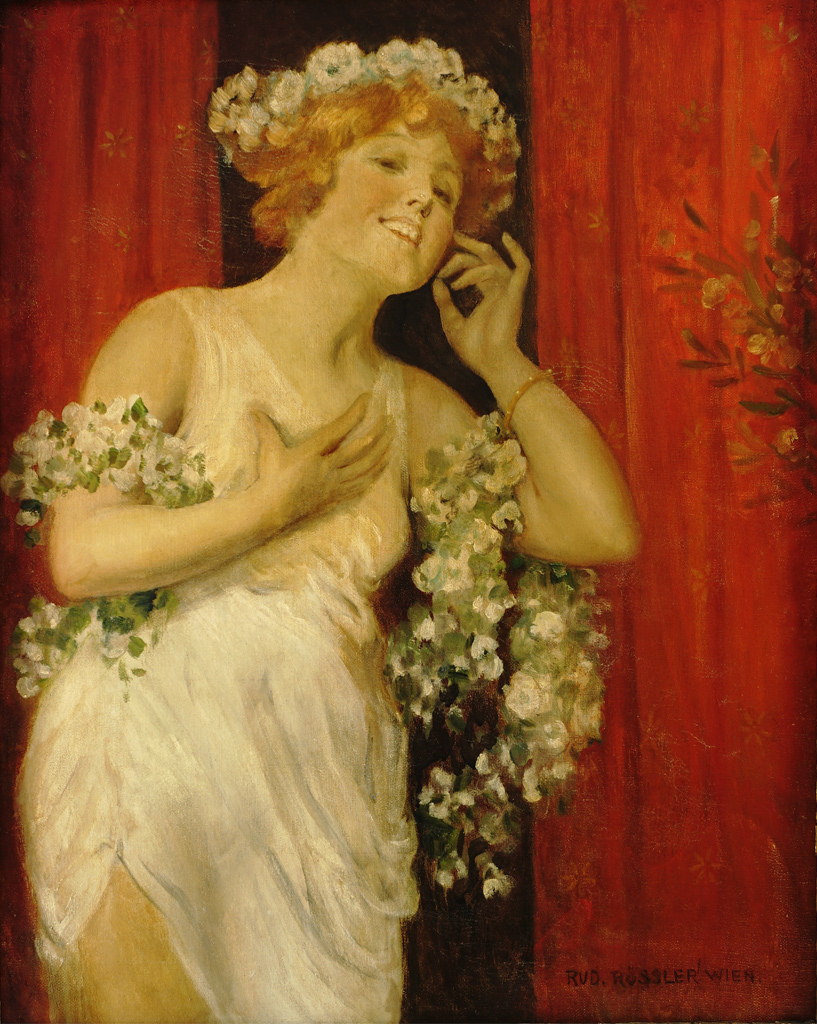
Tänzerin vor Vorhang

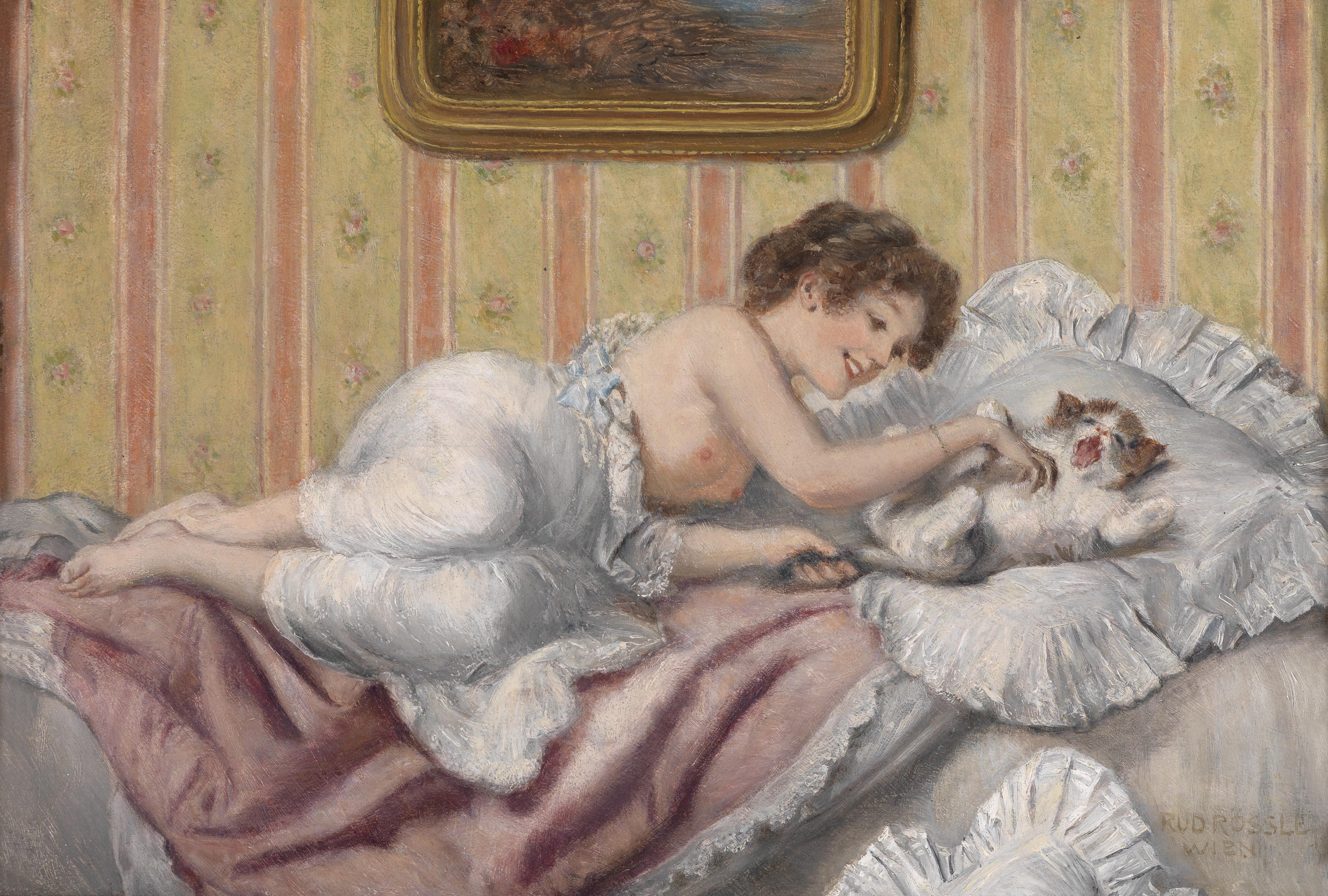
Der kleine Liebling

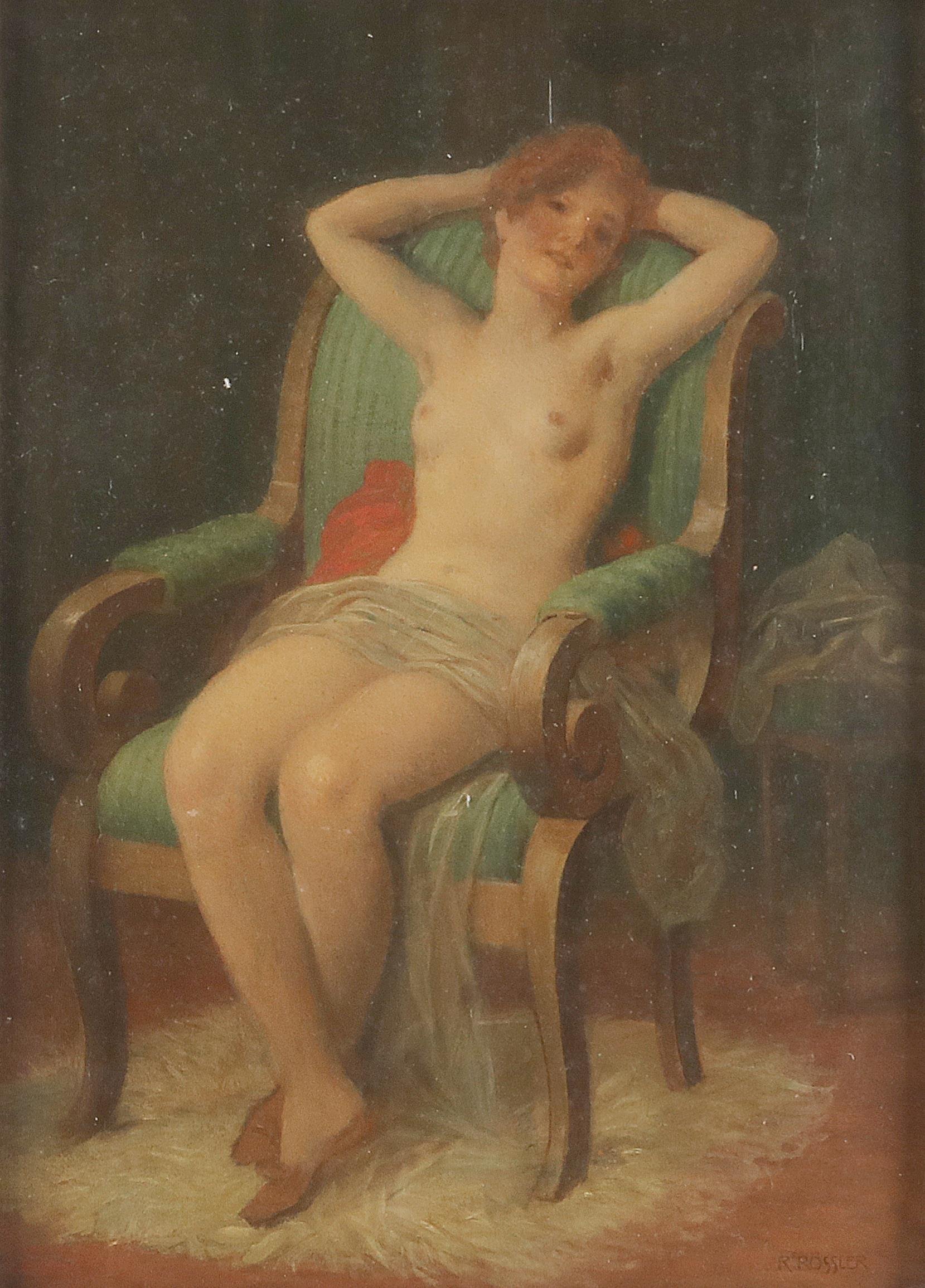
Der grüne Lehnstul

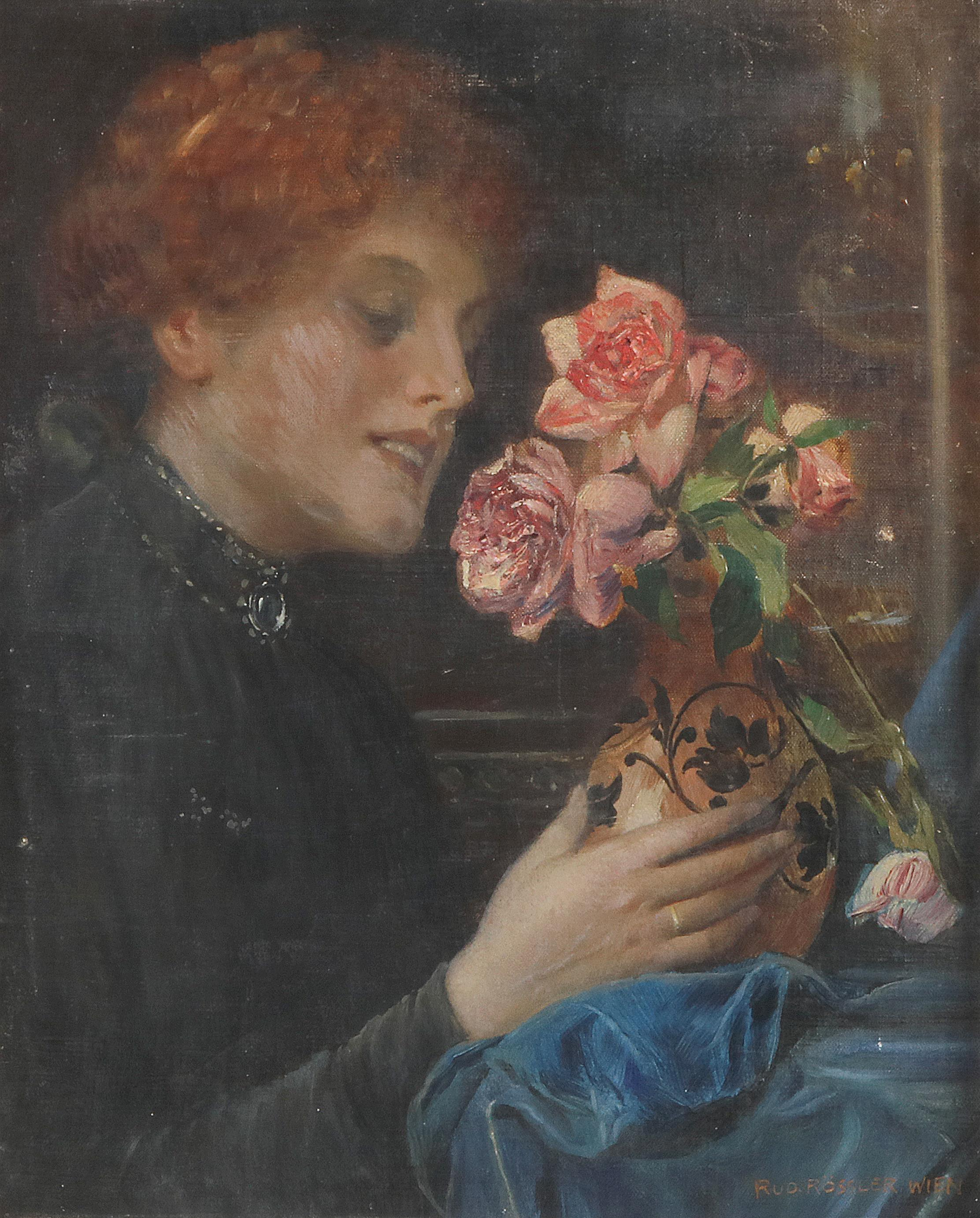
Duft der Rosen

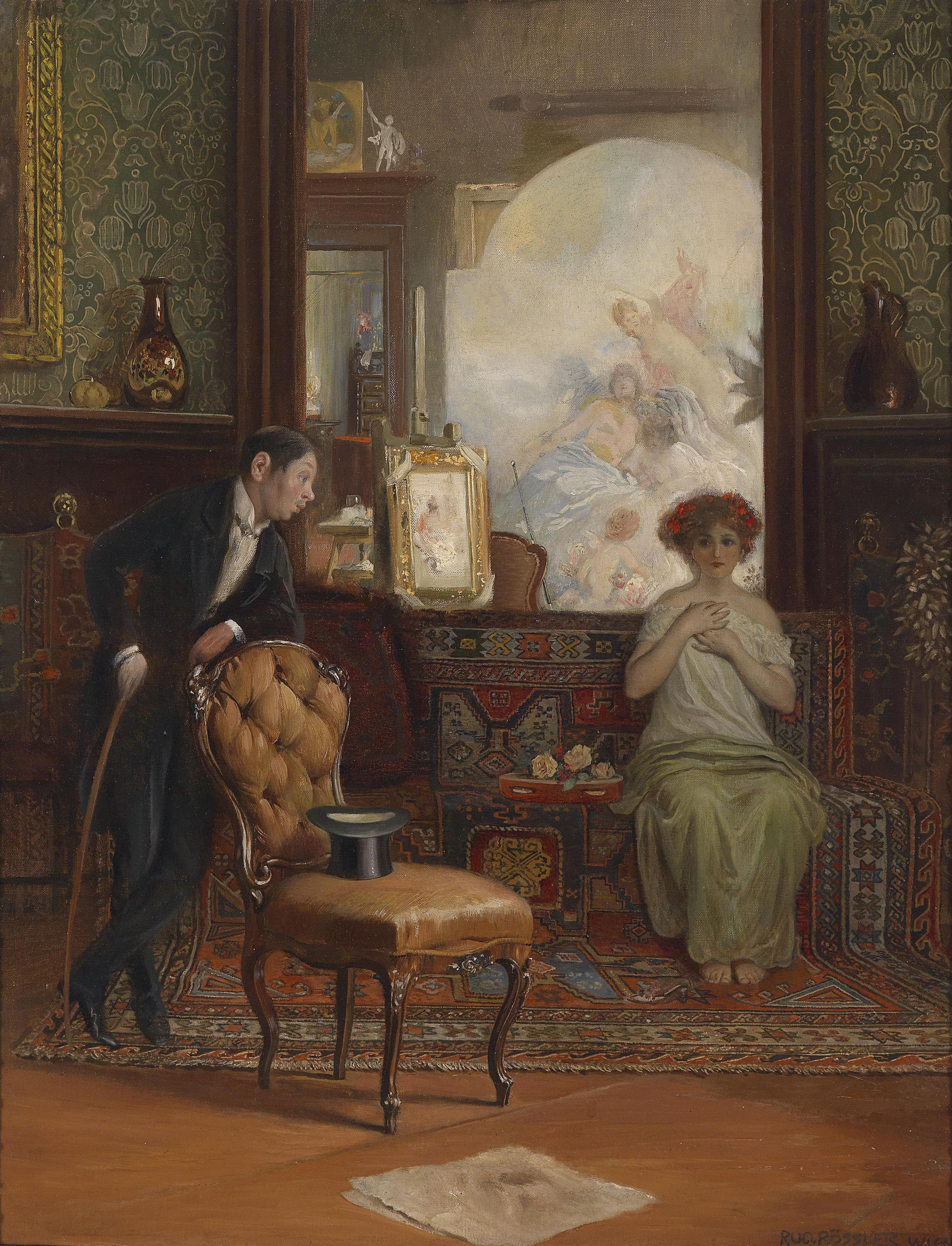
Überraschender Besuch

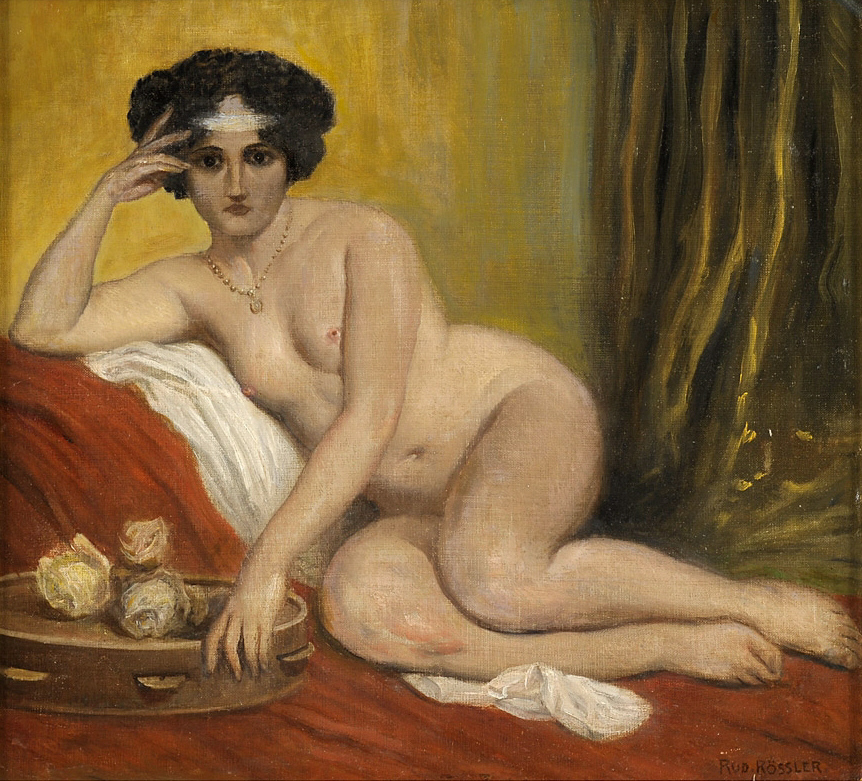
Odaliske

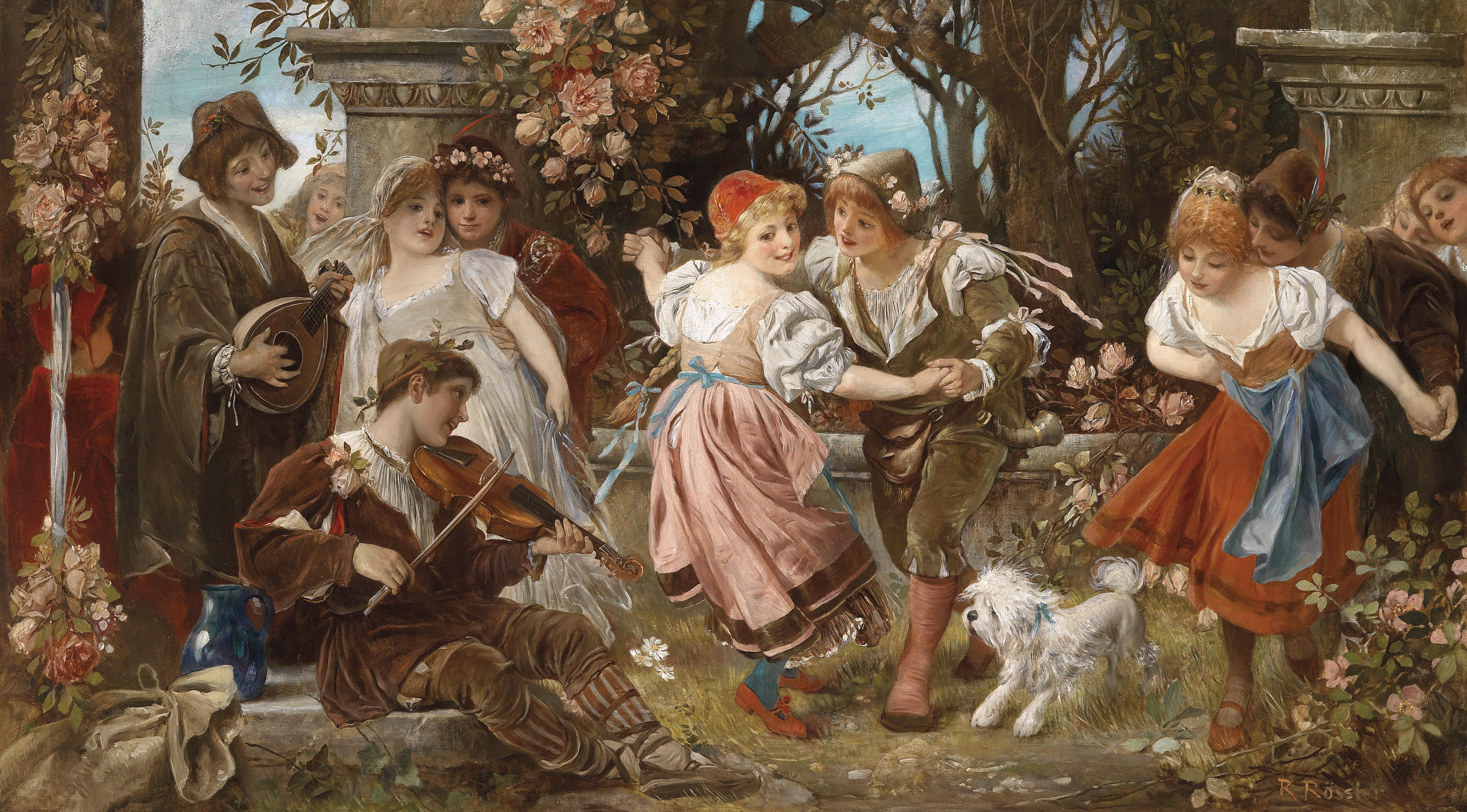
Kinderreigen

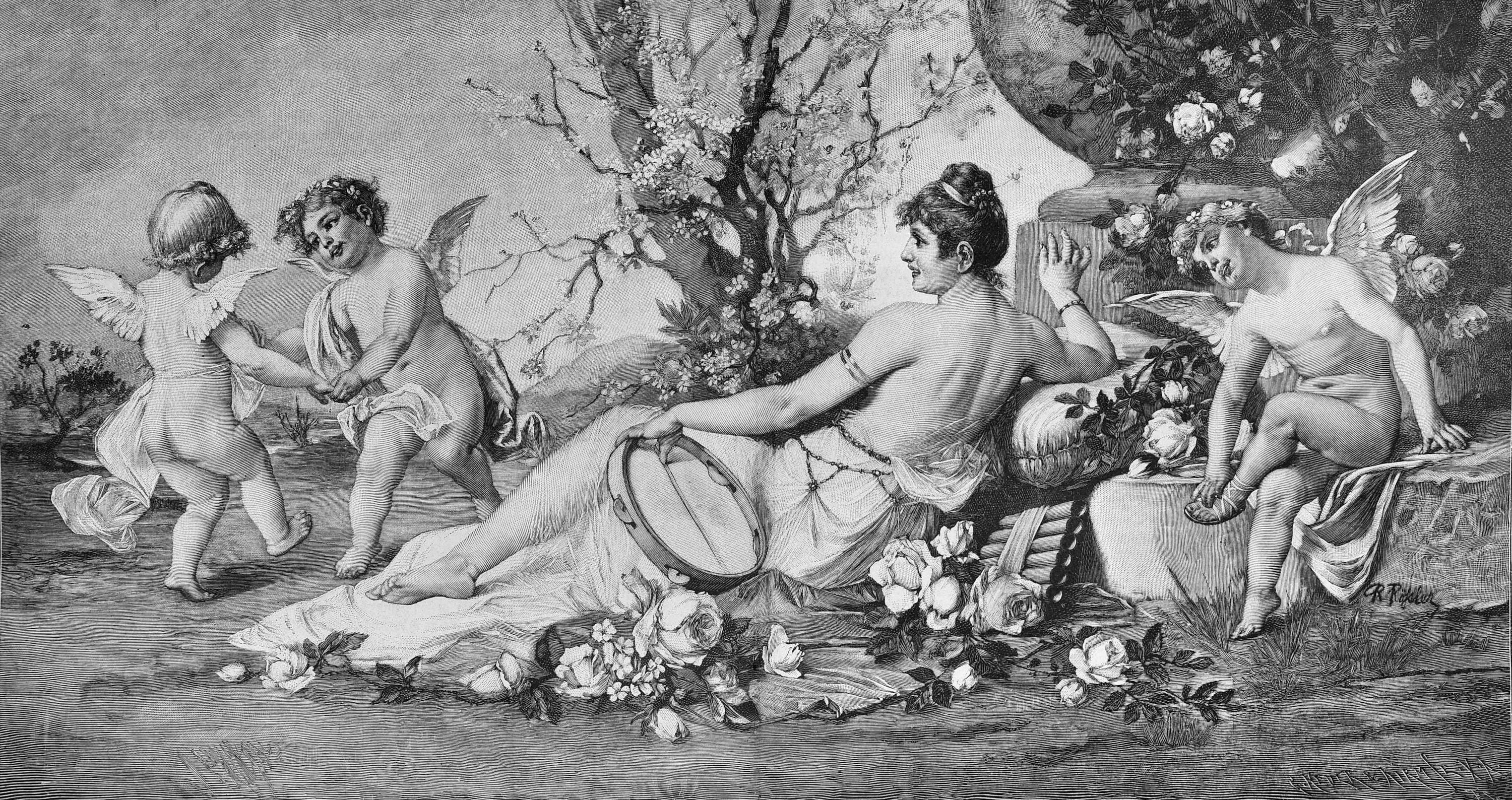
Die Gartenlaube (1894)

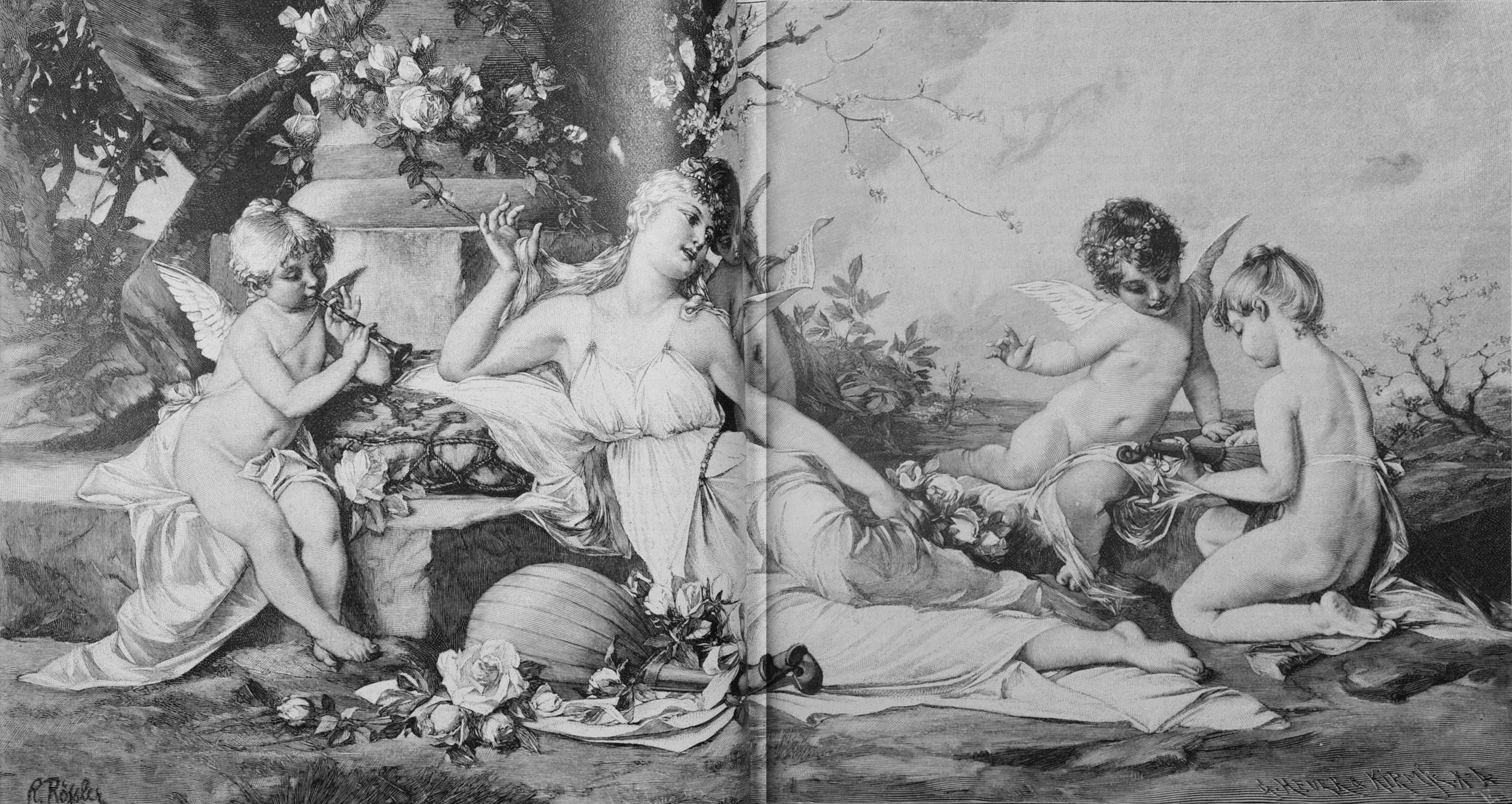
Die Gartenlaube (1895)

== Sources ==
- Beyer, Andreas; Savoy, Bénédicte; Tegethoff, Wolf, eds. (2021). "Rößler, Rudolf". In Allgemeines Künstlerlexikon - Internationale Künstlerdatenbank - Online. K. G. Saur. Retrieved 8 October 2022.
- Boetticher, Friedrich von (1898). "Rössler, Rudolf". In Malerwerke des Neunzehnten Jahrhunderts. Beitrag zur Kunstgeschichte. Vol. 2. Dresden: Fr. v. Boetticher's Verlag. pp. 473–474.
- Vollmer, Hans, ed. (1934). "Rössler, Rudolf". In Allgemeines Lexikon der Bildenden Künstler von der Antike bis zur Gegenwart. Vol. 28. Leipzig: E. A. Seemann. p. 503.
- "Rössler, Rudolf". Benezit Dictionary of Artists. 2011. Oxford Art Online. Retrieved 8 October 2022.
