= Depictions of Muhammad =

Visual depictions of Prophet Muhammad

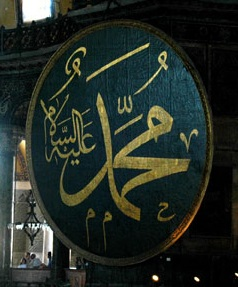
Muhammad's name on a wooden disk in the Hagia Sophia in Istanbul, Turkey

The permissibility of depictions of Muhammad in Islam has been a contentious issue. Oral and written descriptions of Muhammad are readily accepted by all traditions of Islam, but there is disagreement about visual depictions. The Quran does not place any explicit or implicit prohibition on images of Muhammad. The hadith (supplemental teachings) present an ambiguous picture, but there are a few that have prohibited Muslims from creating visual depictions of human figures. It is agreed on all sides that there is no authentic visual tradition (pictures created during Muhammad's lifetime) as to the appearance of Muhammad, although there are early legends of portraits of him, and written physical descriptions whose authenticity is often accepted.

The question of whether images in Islamic art, including those depicting Muhammad, can be considered as religious art remains a matter of contention among scholars. They appear in illustrated books that are normally works of history or poetry, including those with religious subjects; the Quran is never illustrated: "context and intent are essential to understanding Islamic pictorial art. The Muslim artists who created images of Muhammad, as well as the public who viewed them, understood that these images were not intended as objects of worship. Nor were the objects so decorated used as part of religious worship".

However, scholars concede that such images have "a spiritual element", and were also sometimes used in informal religious devotions celebrating the day of the Mi'raj. Many visual depictions only show Muhammad with his face veiled, or symbolically represent him as a flame; other images, notably from before about 1500, show his face. With the notable exception of modern-day Iran, depictions of Muhammad were never numerous in any community or era throughout Islamic history, and appeared almost exclusively in the private medium of Persian and other miniature book illustration. The key medium of public religious art in Islam was and is calligraphy. In Ottoman Turkey the hilya developed as a decorated visual arrangement of texts about Muhammad that was displayed as a portrait might be.

Visual depictions of Muhammad have always been rare in the non-Islamic West. In the Middle Ages they were mostly hostile, and most often appear in illustrations of Dante's poetry. In the Renaissance and Early Modern period, Muhammad was sometimes depicted, typically in a more neutral or heroic light; the depictions began to encounter protests from Muslims. In the age of the Internet, a handful of caricature depictions printed in the European press have caused global protests and controversy and been associated with violence.

== Background ==
Although nothing in the Quran explicitly bans images, some supplemental hadith explicitly ban the drawing of images of any living creature; other hadith tolerate images, but never encourage them. Hence, most Muslims avoid visual depictions of any prophet or messenger such as Muhammad, Moses, and Abraham.

Most Sunni Muslims believe that visual depictions of all the prophets and messengers should be prohibited and are particularly averse to visual representations of Muhammad. The key concern is that the use of images can encourage shirk or "idolatry". In Shia Islam, however, images of Muhammad are quite common nowadays even though historically, Shia scholars opposed such depictions. (Note: Thomas Walker Arnold says "It was not merely Sunni schools of law but Shia jurists also who fulminated against this figured art. Because the Persians are Shiites, many Europeans writers have assumed that the Shia sect had not the same objection to representing living being as the rival set of the Sunni; but such an opinion ignores the fact that Shiisum did not become the state church in Persia until the rise of the Safivid dynasty at the beginning of the 16th century.") Still, many Muslims who take a stricter view of the supplemental traditions will sometimes challenge any depiction of Muhammad, including those created and published by non-Muslims.

Many major religions have experienced times during their history when images of their religious figures were forbidden. In Judaism, one of the Ten Commandments states "Thou shalt not make unto thee any graven image", while in the Christian New Testament all covetousness (greed) is defined as idolatry. During the periods of Byzantine Iconoclasm in the eighth century, and again during the ninth century, visual representations of sacred figures were forbidden by the Ecumenical Patriarchate of Constantinople, and only the Christian cross could be depicted in churches. The visual representation of Jesus and other religious figures remains a concern in parts of stricter Protestant Christianity.

== Portraiture of Muhammad in Islamic literature ==
Several hadith and other writings of the early Islamic period include stories in which portraits of Muhammad appear. Abu Hanifa Dinawari, ibn al-Faqih, Ibn Wahshiyya, and Abu Nu'aym al-Isfahani tell versions of a story in which the Byzantine Emperor Heraclius is visited by two Meccans. He shows them a cabinet, handed down to him from Alexander the Great and created by God for Adam, each of whose drawers contains a portrait of a prophet. They are astonished to see a portrait of Muhammad in the final drawer. Sadid al-Din al-Kazaruni tells a similar story in which the Meccans are visiting the king of China. Al-Kisa'i tells that God did indeed give portraits of the prophets to Adam.

Ibn Wahshiyya and Abu Nuʿaym al-Isfahani tell a second story in which a Meccan merchant visiting Syria is invited to a Christian monastery where several sculptures and paintings depict prophets and saints. There he sees the images of Muhammad and Abu Bakr, as yet unidentified by the Christians. In an 11th-century story, Muhammad is said to have sat for a portrait by an artist retained by Sasanian emperor Kavad II. The emperor liked the portrait so much that he placed it on his pillow.

Later, al-Maqrizi tells a story in which al-Muqawqis, the ruler of Egypt, met with Muhammad's envoy. He asked the envoy to describe Muhammad and checked the description against a portrait of an unknown prophet which he had on a piece of cloth. The description matches the portrait.

In a 17th-century Chinese Muslim story, when the emperor asked to meet Muhammad, he responded by sending a portrait. The king was so enamoured of the portrait that he converted to Islam, at which point the portrait, having fulfilled its mission, disappeared.

== Depiction by Muslims ==
=== Verbal descriptions ===
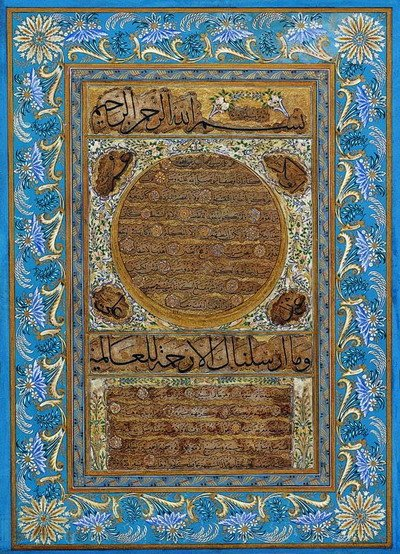
Hilye by Hâfiz Osman (1642–1698)

In one of the earliest sources, ibn Sa'd's Kitab al-Tabaqat al-Kabir, there are numerous verbal descriptions of Muhammad. One description sourced to Ali is as follows:

[H]e was neither too tall nor too short, rather he was of medium height among people. His hair was neither short and curly, nor was it long and straight, it hung in waves. His face was neither fleshy nor plump, but it had a roundness; rosy white, with very dark eyes and long eyelashes. He was large-boned as well as broad shouldered, hairless except for a thin line that stretched down his chest to his navel. His hand and feet were coarse. When he walked he would lean forward as if descending a hill [...] Between his two shoulders was the Seal of Prophethood, and he was the Seal of the Prophets.

From the Ottoman period on, such texts have been presented on calligraphic hilya panels (Ottoman Turkish: حلية, romanized: hilye, pl. hilyeler, from Arabic: حلية, romanized: ḥilya, lit. 'ornament', plural ḥilān), commonly surrounded by an elaborate frame of illuminated decoration and either included in books or, more often, muraqqas, or albums, or sometimes placed in wooden frames so that they can hang on a wall. The elaborated form of the calligraphic tradition was founded in the 17th century by the Ottoman calligrapher Hâfiz Osman. While containing a concrete and artistically appealing description of Muhammad's appearance, they complied with the strictures against figurative depictions of Muhammad, leaving his appearance to the viewer's imagination. Several parts of the complex design were named after parts of the body, from the head downwards, indicating the explicit purpose of the hilye as a substitute for a figurative depiction.

The Ottoman hilye format customarily starts with the basmala shown on top and is separated in the middle by Quran 21:107: "And We have not sent you but as a mercy to the worlds". Four compartments set around the central one often contain the names of the Rashidun: Abu Bakr, Umar, Uthman, and Ali, each followed by radhi Allahu anhu "may God be pleased with him".

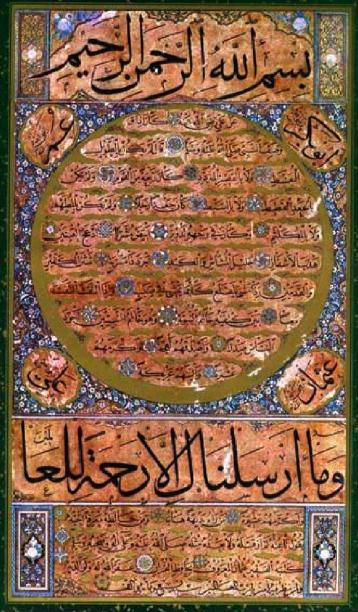
Hilye by Hâfiz Osman

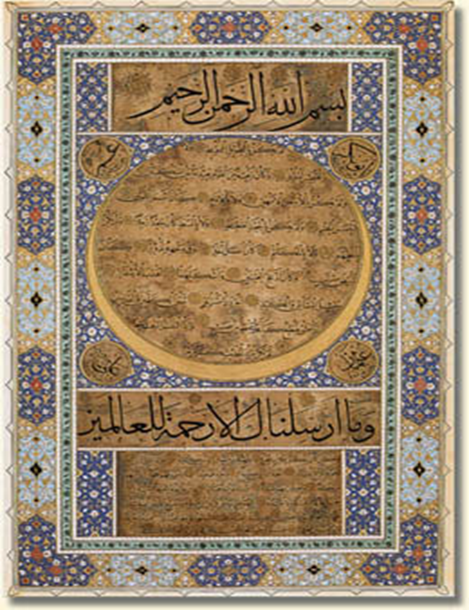
Hilye by Hâfiz Osman

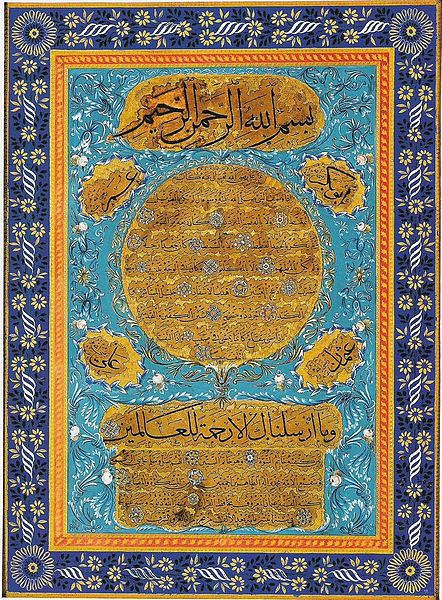
Hilye by Hâfiz Osman

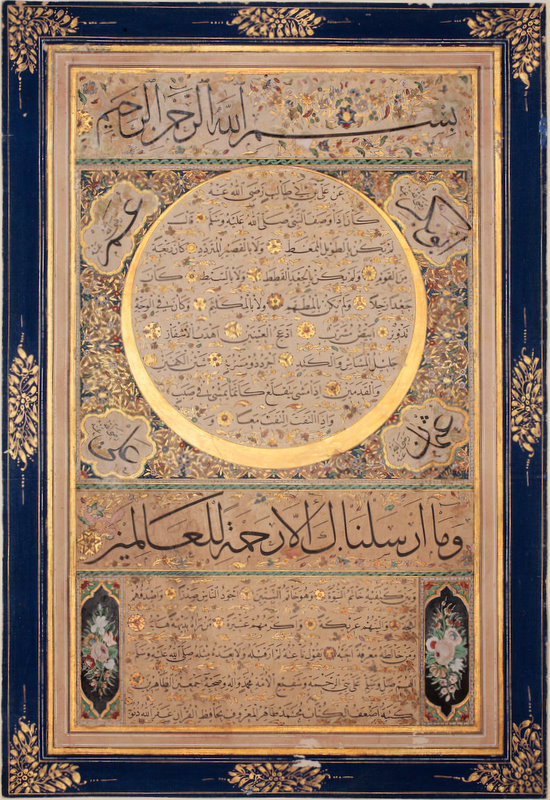
Hilye by Mehmed Tahir Efendi (d. 1848)

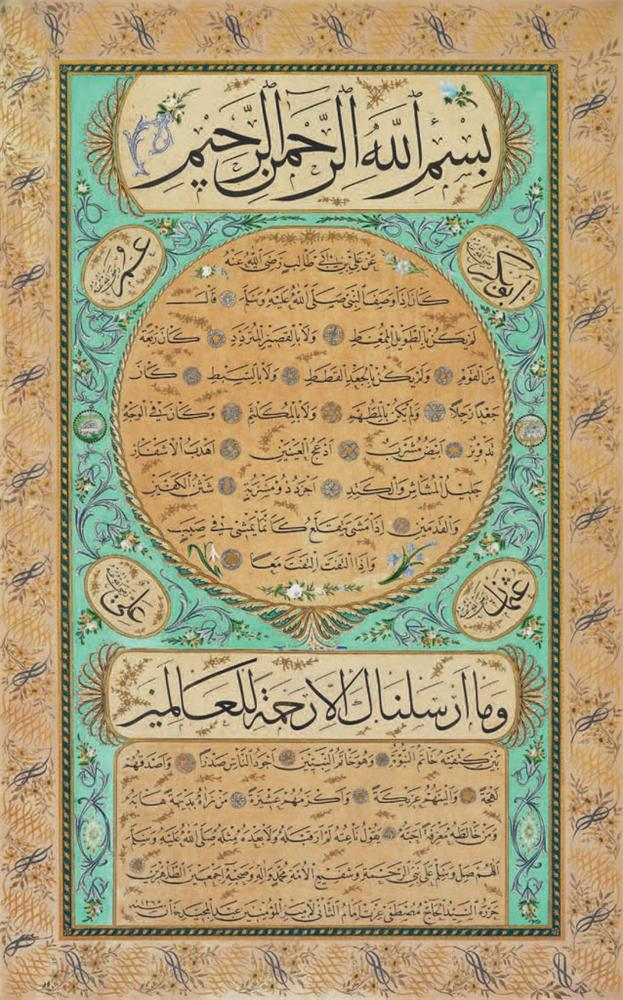
Hilye by Kazasker Mustafa İzzet Efendi (1801–1876)

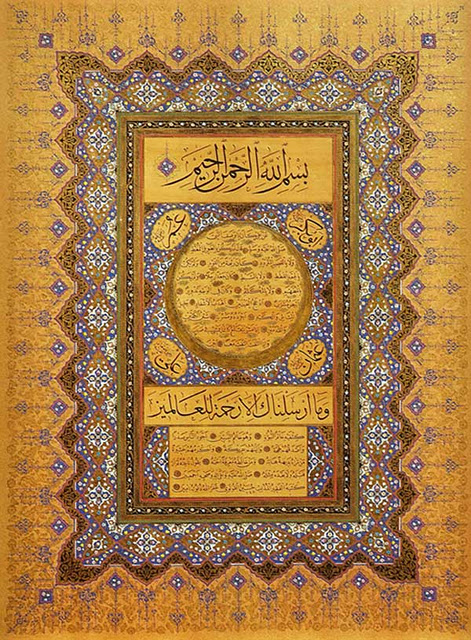
Hilye by Kazasker Mustafa İzzet Efendi

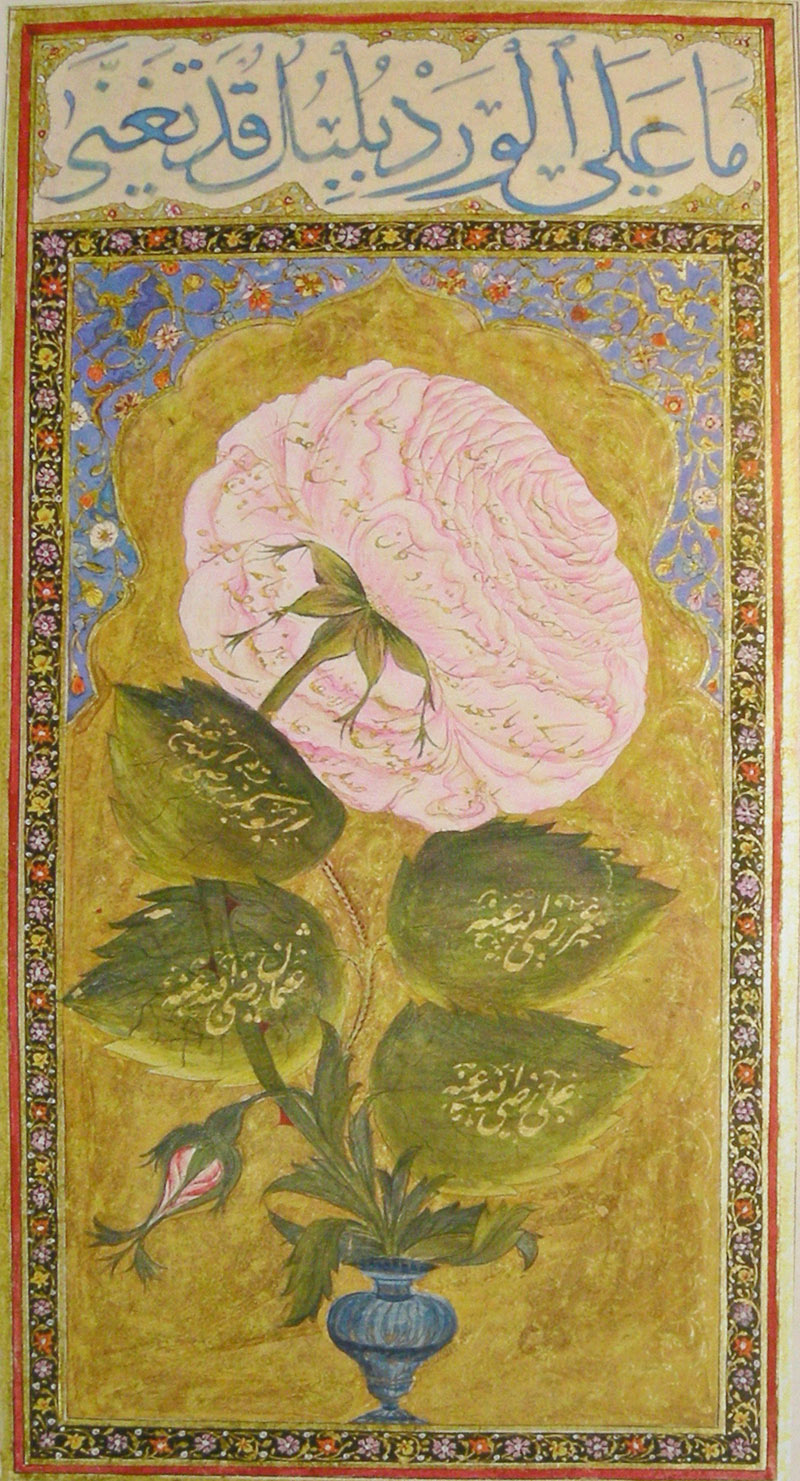
Hilye inscribed on the petals of a pink rose symbolising Muhammad (18th century)

=== Calligraphic representations ===
The most common visual representation of the Muhammad in Islamic art, especially in Arabic-speaking areas, is by a calligraphic representation of his name, a sort of monogram in roughly circular form, often given a decorated frame. Such inscriptions are normally in Arabic, and may rearrange or repeat forms, or add a blessing or honorific, or for example the word "messenger" or a contraction of it. The range of ways of representing Muhammad's name is considerable, including ambigrams; he is also frequently symbolised by a rose.

The more elaborate versions relate to other Islamic traditions of special forms of calligraphy such as those writing the names of God, and the secular tughra or elaborate monogram of Ottoman rulers.

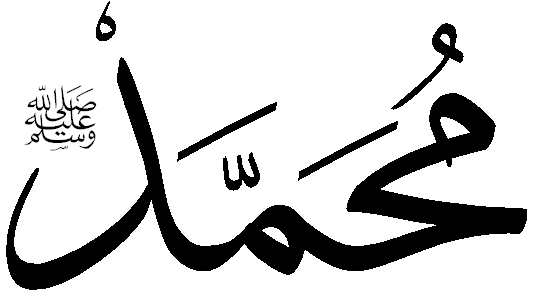
Muhammad's name in Thuluth, an Arabic calligraphic script; the smaller writing in the top left means "Peace be upon him".

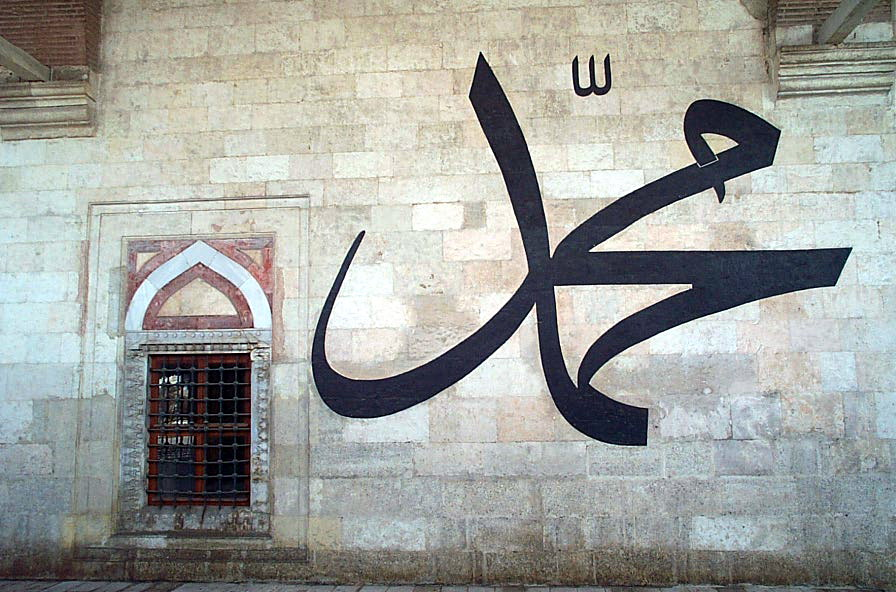
Calligraphic representation of Muhammad's name, painted on the wall of a mosque in Edirne in Turkey

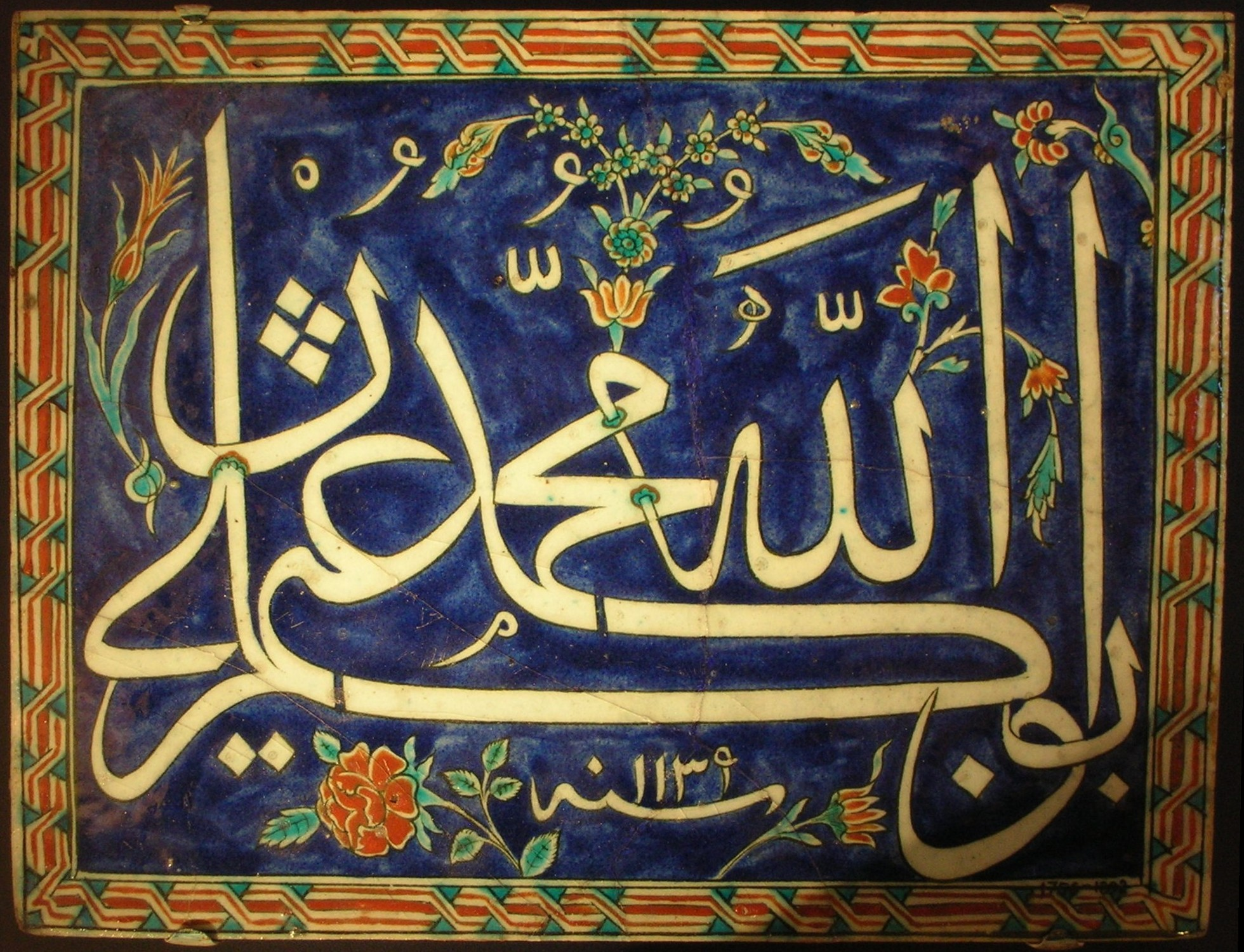
Calligraphy tile from Turkey (18th century), containing the names of God, Muhammad, and his first four successors, Abu Bakr, Umar, Uthman and Ali

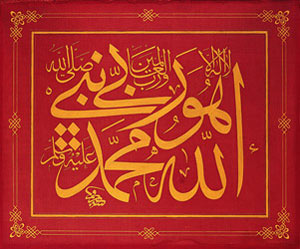
Late 18th- or early 19th-century calligraphic panel by Mustafa Rakim

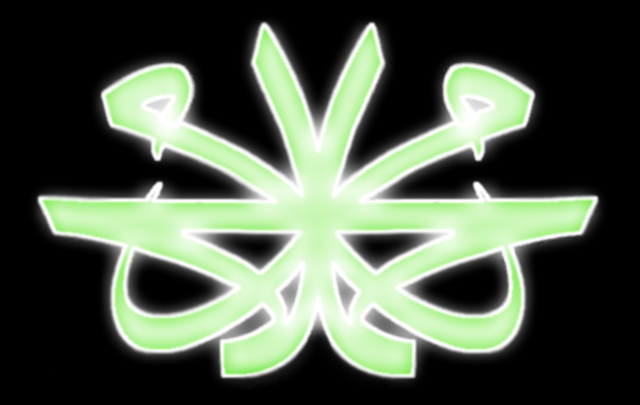
Mirror calligraphy of Muhammad's name

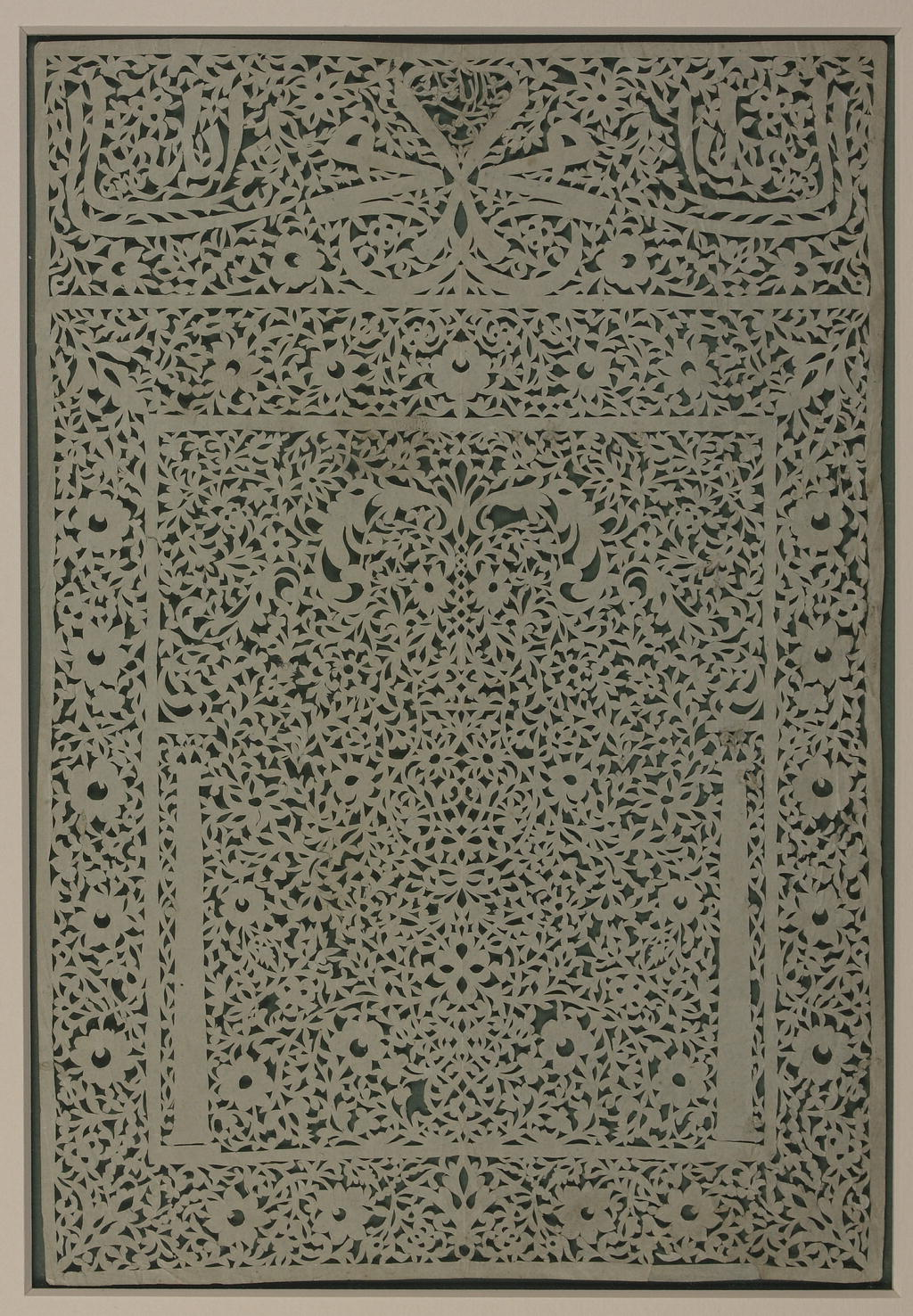
Decoupage calligraphy (18th or 19th century) with Muhammad's name in mirror script, top centre; the area below represents a mihrab, or prayer niche.

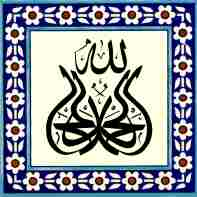
Palestinian pottery calligraphy featuring the names of God (الله) and Muhammad (محمد)

Ambigram – Muhammad (محمد) upside down is read as Ali (علي), and vice versa.

Fourfold Muhammad in square (or geometric) Kufic script, often used as a tilework pattern in Islamic architecture

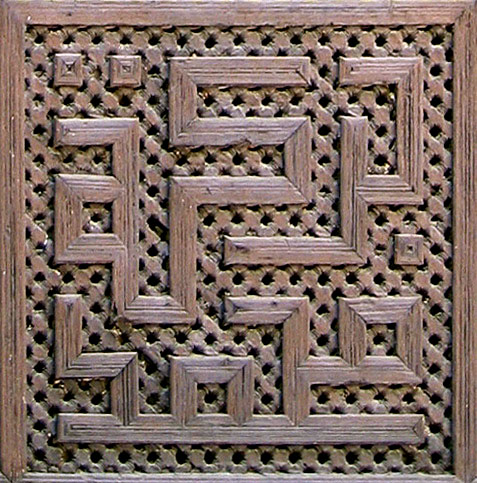
Geometric Kufic from the Bou Inania Madrasa (Meknes); the text reads بركة محمد or baraka muḥammad, i.e. be blessed Muhammad.

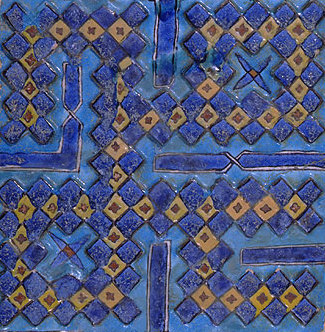
Tile from a 14th-century mausoleum in Uzbekistan, inscribed with Muhammad's name (محمد) in square Kufic; one of a set used to frame a doorway

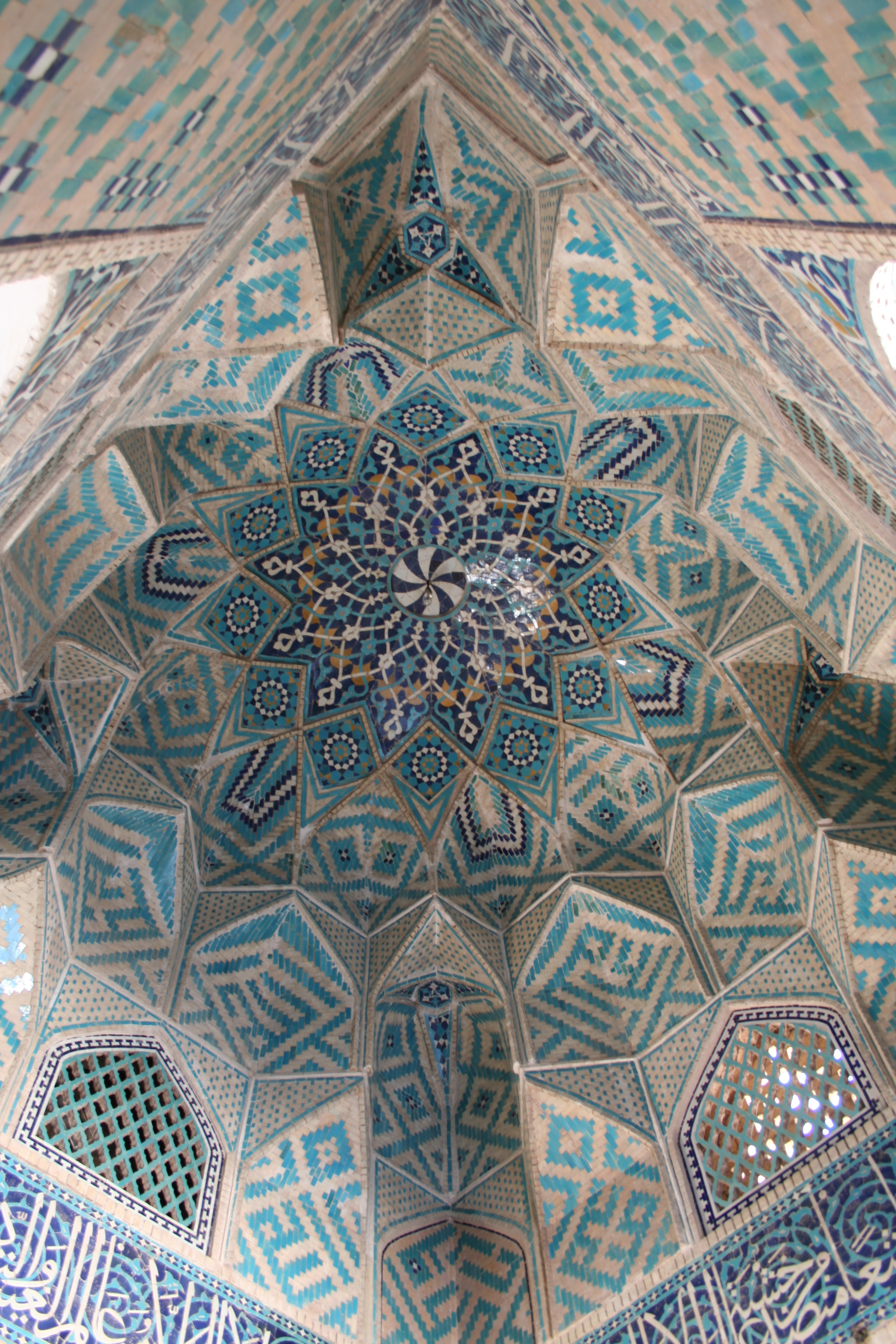
Mosque cupola, with Quranic inscriptions and Kufic representations of Allah's and Muhammad's names worked into the tiling

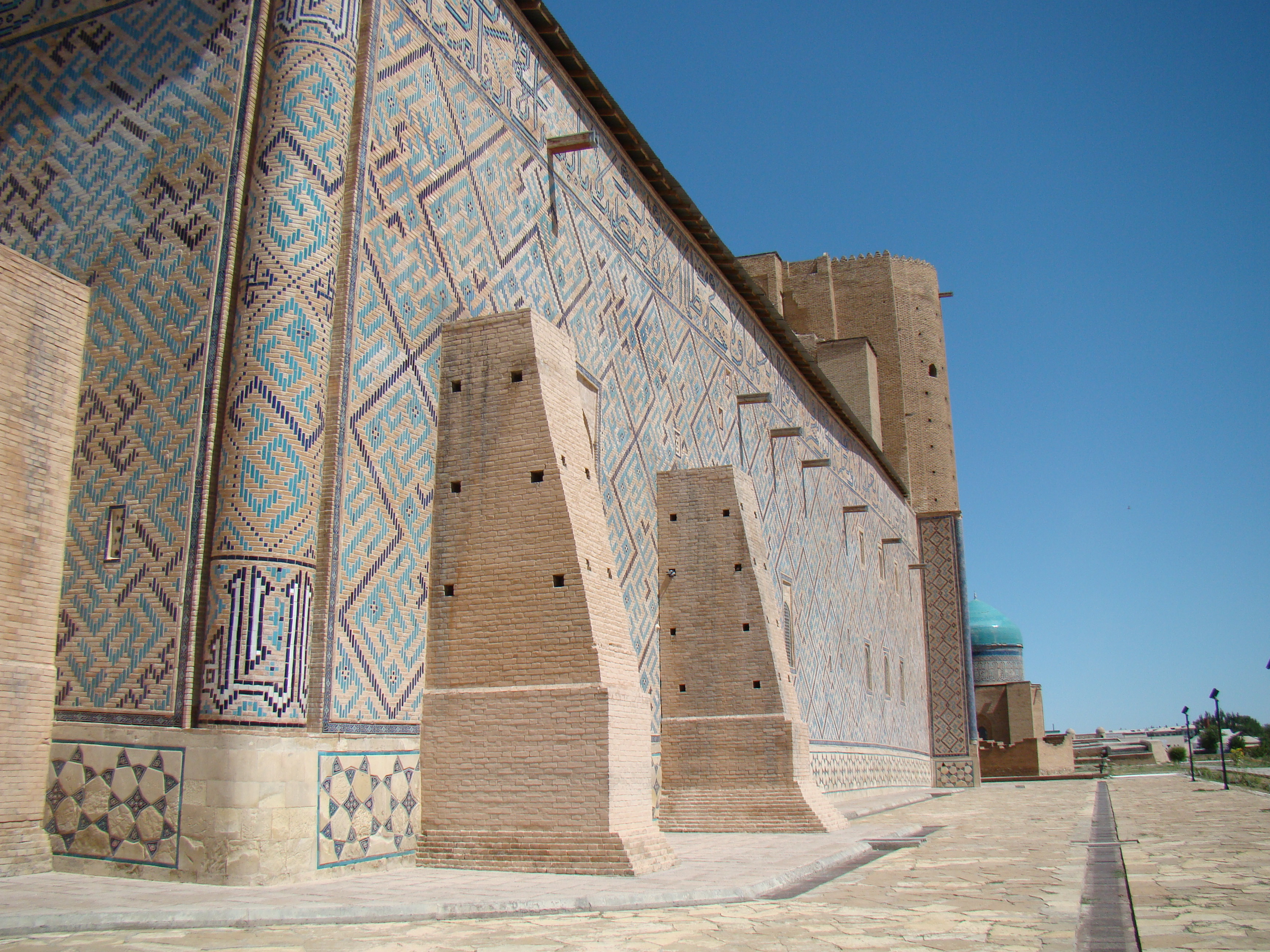
Banna'i incorporating square Kufic representations of Muhammad's name on the Mausoleum of Khoja Ahmed Yasavi, Kazakhstan

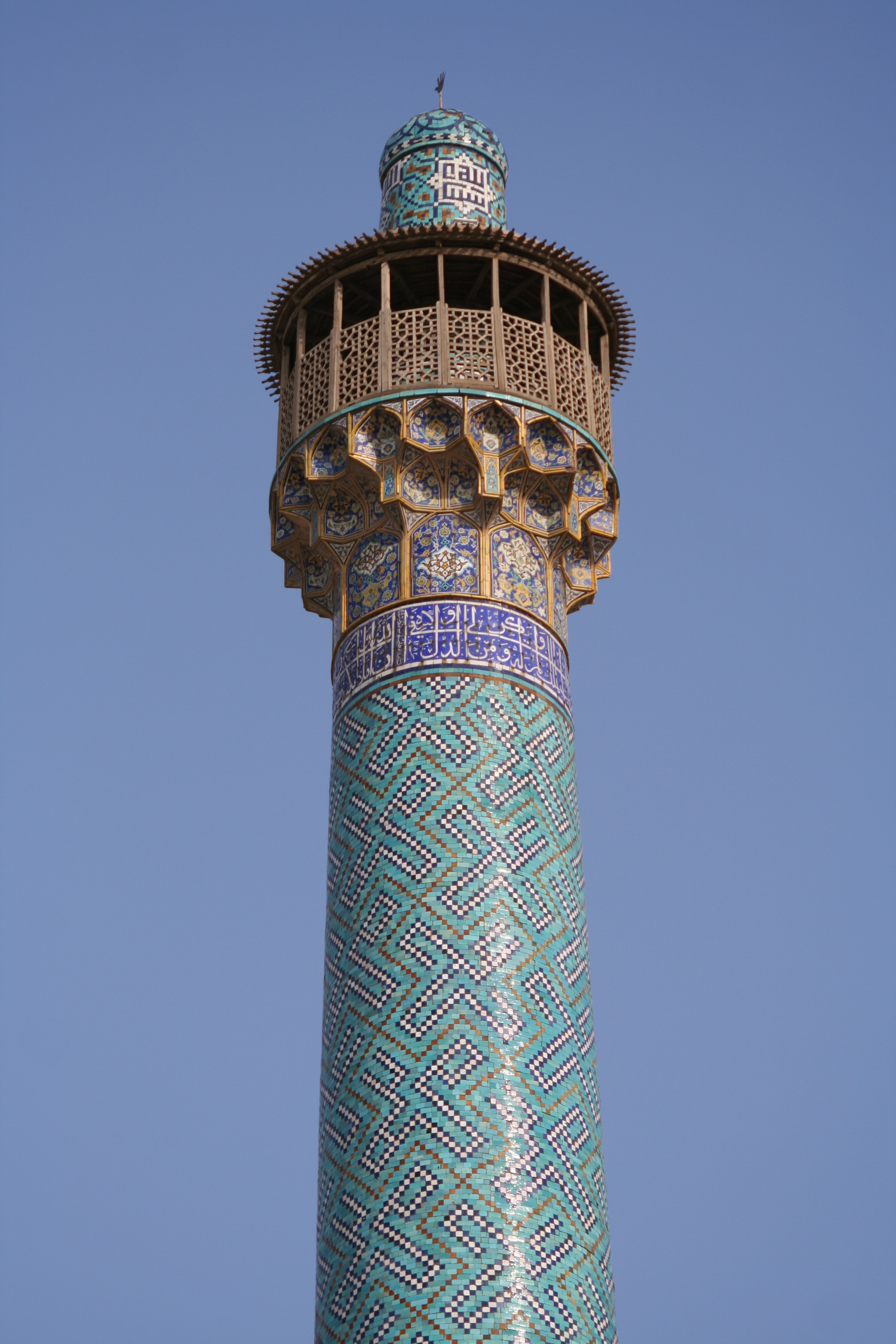
Banna'i on the Royal Mosque in Isfahan, Iran, with square Kufic repeats of Muhammad's and Ali's names

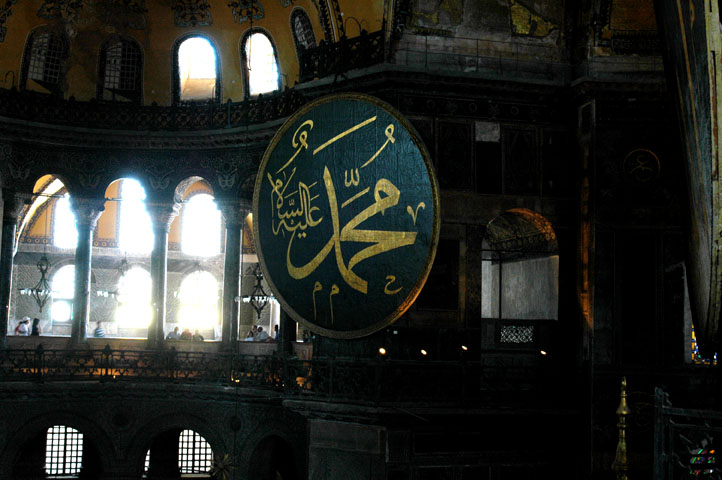
Muhammad's name on a wooden disk in Hagia Sophia

=== Figurative visual depictions ===
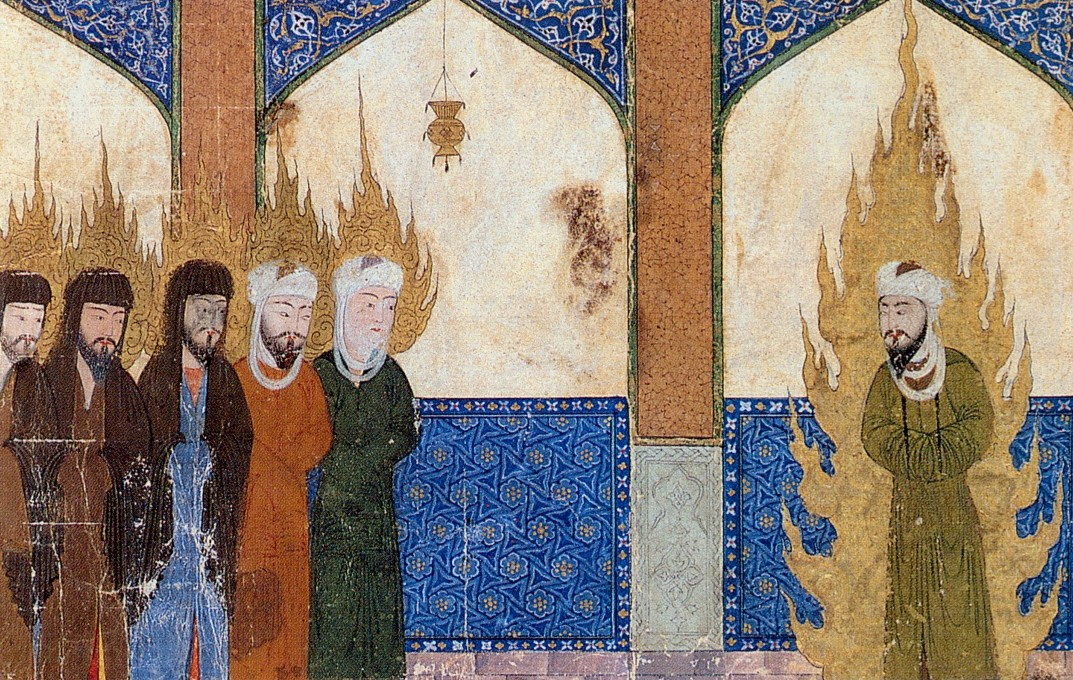
Muhammad (depicted right) leads Abraham, Moses, Jesus and others in prayer. Persian miniature, 15th century

Throughout Islamic history, depictions of Muhammad in Islamic art were rare. Even so, there exists a "notable corpus of images of Muhammad produced, mostly in the form of manuscript illustrations, in various regions of the Islamic world from the thirteenth century through modern times". Depictions of Muhammad date back to the start of the tradition of Persian miniatures as illustrations in books. The illustrated book from the Persianate world (Warka and Gulshah, Topkapi Palace Library H. 841, attributed to Konya 1200–1250) contains the two earliest known Islamic depictions of Muhammad.

This book dates to before or just around the time of the Mongol invasion of Anatolia in the 1240s, and before the campaigns against Persia and Iraq of the 1250s, which destroyed great numbers of books in libraries. Recent scholarship has noted that, although surviving early examples are now uncommon, generally human figurative art was a continuous tradition in Islamic lands (such as in literature, science, and history); as early as the 8th century, such art flourished during the Abbasid Caliphate (c. 749 - 1258, across Spain, North Africa, Egypt, Syria, Turkey, Mesopotamia, and Persia).

Christiane Gruber traces a development from 'veristic' images depicting the entire body and face during the 13th to 15th centuries, to more "abstract" representations in the 16th to 19th centuries, the latter including the representation of Muhammad by a special type of calligraphic representation, with the older types also remaining in use. An intermediate type, first found from about 1400, is the "inscribed portrait" where the face of Muhammad is blank, with "Ya Muhammad" ("O Muhammad") or a similar phrase written in the space instead; these may be related to Sufi thought. In some cases the inscription appears to have been an underpainting that would later be covered by a face or veil, so a pious act by the painter, for his eyes alone, but in others it was intended to be seen. According to Gruber, a good number of these paintings later underwent iconoclastic mutilations, in which the facial features of Muhammad were scratched or smeared, as Muslim views on the acceptability of veristic images changed.

A number of extant Persian manuscripts representing Muhammad date from the Ilkhanid period under the new Mongol rulers, including a Marzubannama dating to 1299. The Ilkhanid MS Arab 161 of 1307/8 contains 25 illustrations found in an illustrated version of Al-Biruni's The Remaining Signs of Past Centuries, of which five include depictions Muhammad, including the two concluding images, the largest and most accomplished in the manuscript, which emphasize the relation of Muhammad and `Ali according to Shi`ite doctrine. According to Christiane Gruber, other works use images to promote Sunni Islam, such as a set of Mi'raj illustrations (MS H 2154) in the early 14th century, although other historians have dated the same illustrations to the Jalayrid period of Shia rulers.

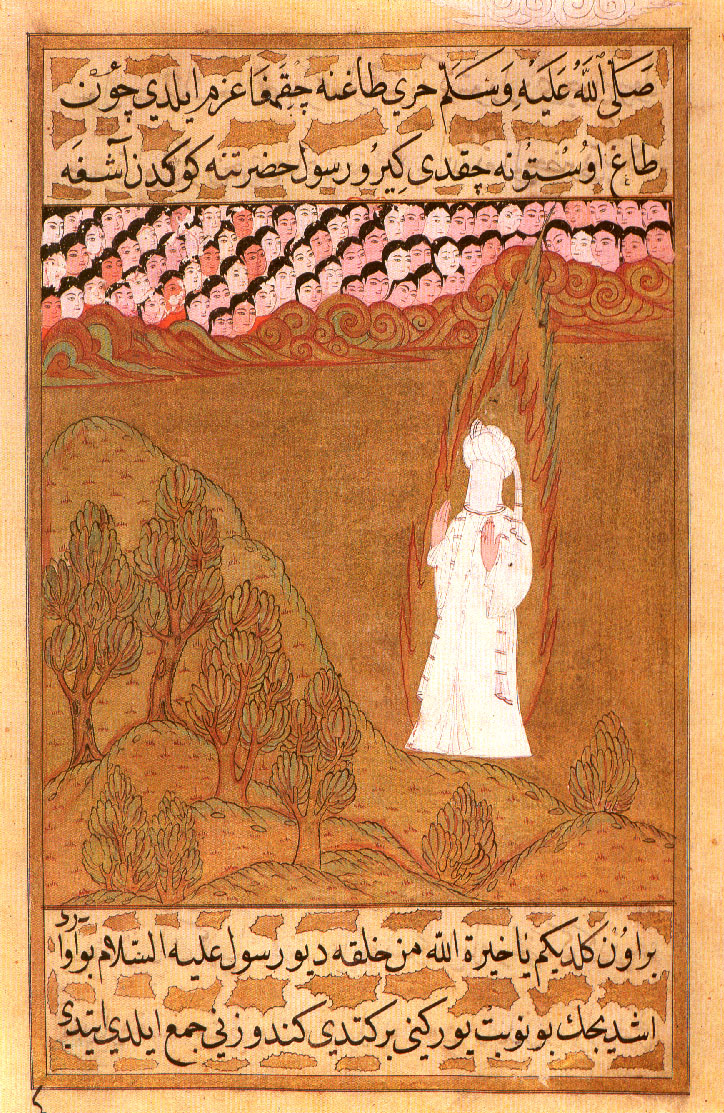
Muhammad, shown with a veiled face and halo, at Mount Hira (16th-century Ottoman illustration of the Siyer-i Nebi)

Depictions of Muhammad are also found in Persian manuscripts in the following Timurid and Safavid dynasties, and Turkish Ottoman art in the 14th to 17th centuries, and beyond. Perhaps the most elaborate cycle of illustrations of Muhammad's life is the copy, completed in 1595, of the 14th-century biography Siyer-i Nebi commissioned by the Ottoman sultan Murat III for his son, the future Mehmed III, containing over 800 illustrations.

Probably the commonest narrative scene represented is the Mi'raj; according to Gruber, "There exist countless single-page paintings of the meʿrāj included in the beginnings of Persian and Turkish romances and epic stories produced from the beginning of the 15th century to the 20th century". These images were also used in celebrations of the anniversary of the Mi'raj on 27 Rajab, when the accounts were recited aloud to male groups: "Didactic and engaging, oral stories of the ascension seem to have had the religious goal of inducing attitudes of praise among their audiences". Such practices are most easily documented in the 18th and 19th centuries, but manuscripts from much earlier appear to have fulfilled the same function. Otherwise a large number of different scenes may be represented at times, from Muhammad's birth to the end of his life, and his existence in Paradise.

==== Halo ====
In the earliest depictions Muhammad may be shown with or without a halo, the earliest halos being round in the style of Christian art, but before long a flaming halo or aureole in the Buddhist or Chinese tradition becomes more common than the circular form found in the West, when a halo is used. A halo or flame may surround only his head, but often his whole body, and in some images the body itself cannot be seen for the halo. This "luminous" form of representation avoided the issues caused by "veristic" images, and could be taken to convey qualities of Muhammad's person described in texts. If the body is visible, the face may be covered with a veil (see gallery for examples of both types). This form of representation, which began at the start of the Safavid period in Persia, was done out of reverence and respect. Other prophets of Islam, and Muhammad's wives and relations, may be treated in similar ways if they also appear.

T. W. Arnold (1864–1930), an early historian of Islamic art, stated that "Islam has never welcomed painting as a handmaid of religion as both Buddhism and Christianity have done. Mosques have never been decorated with religious pictures, nor has a pictorial art been employed for the instruction of the heathen or for the edification of the faithful." Comparing Islam to Christianity, he also writes: "Accordingly, there has never been any historical tradition in the religious painting of Islam – no artistic development in the representation of accepted types – no schools of painters of religious subjects; least of all has there been any guidance on the part of leaders of religious thought corresponding to that of ecclesiastical authorities in the Christian Church."

Images of Muhammad remain controversial to the present day, and are not considered acceptable in many countries in the Middle East. For example, in 1963 an account by a Turkish author of a Hajj pilgrimage to Mecca was banned in Pakistan because it contained reproductions of miniatures showing Muhammad unveiled.

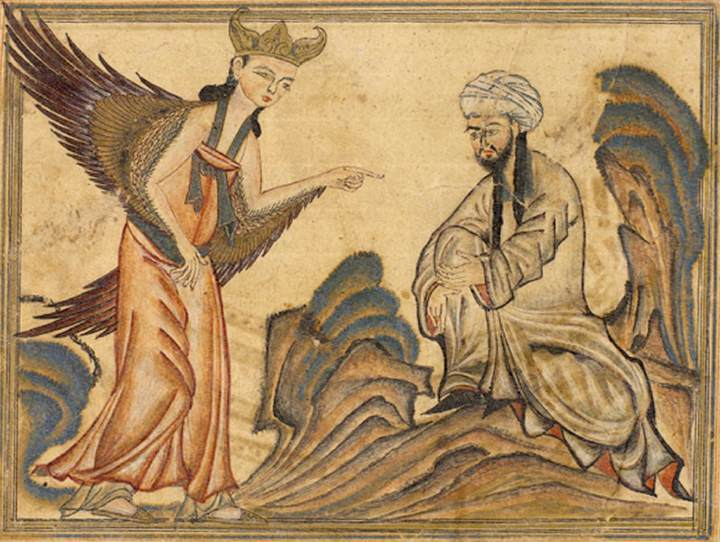
Mohammed receiving his first revelation from the angel Gabriel. Illustration on vellum in Jami' al-tawarikh by Rashid al-Din Hamadani, Tabriz, Persia, 1307.

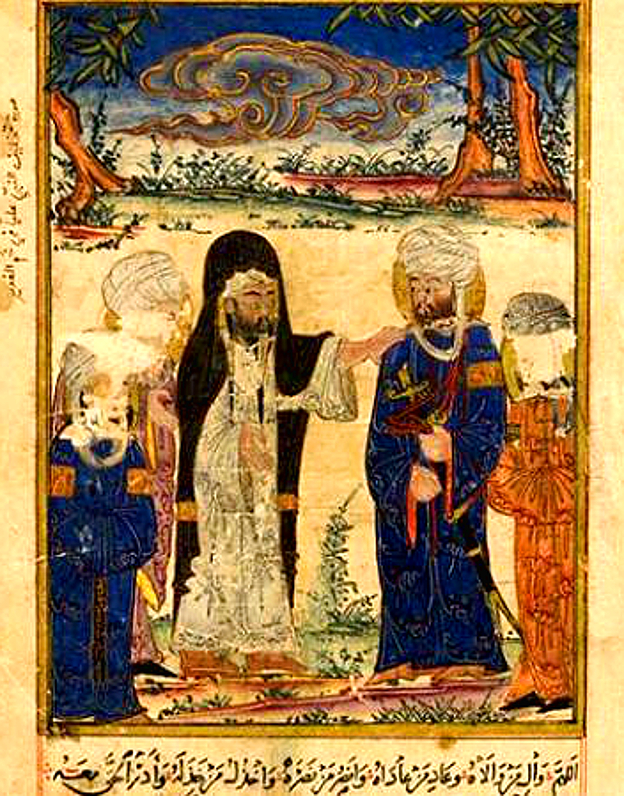
The Investiture of Ali at Ghadir Khumm, MS Arab 161, fol. 162r, Ilkhanid manuscript illustration, 1308–1309.

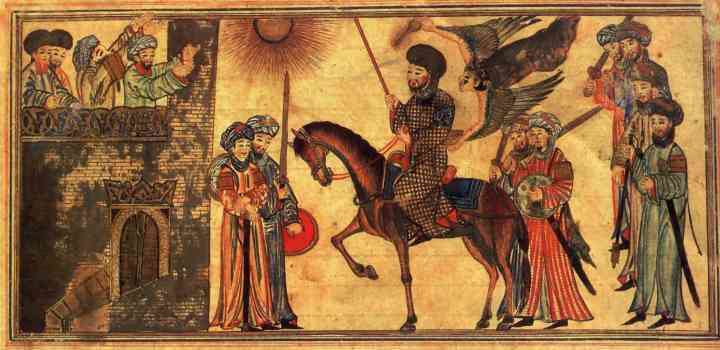
Mohammad (riding the horse) receiving the submission of the Banu Nadir, also Jami Al-Tawarikh. 1314 - 1315.

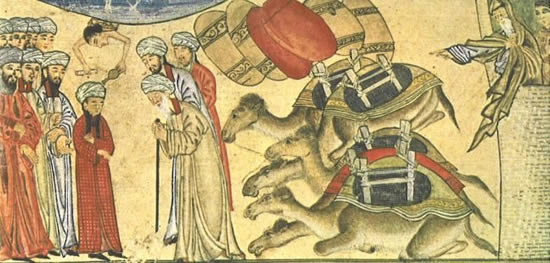
Muhammad meets the monk Bahira. From Jami Al-Tawarikh ("The Universal History" written by Rashid Al-Din), a manuscript in the Library of the University of Edinburgh; illustrated in Tabriz, Muzaffarid period, c. 1315.

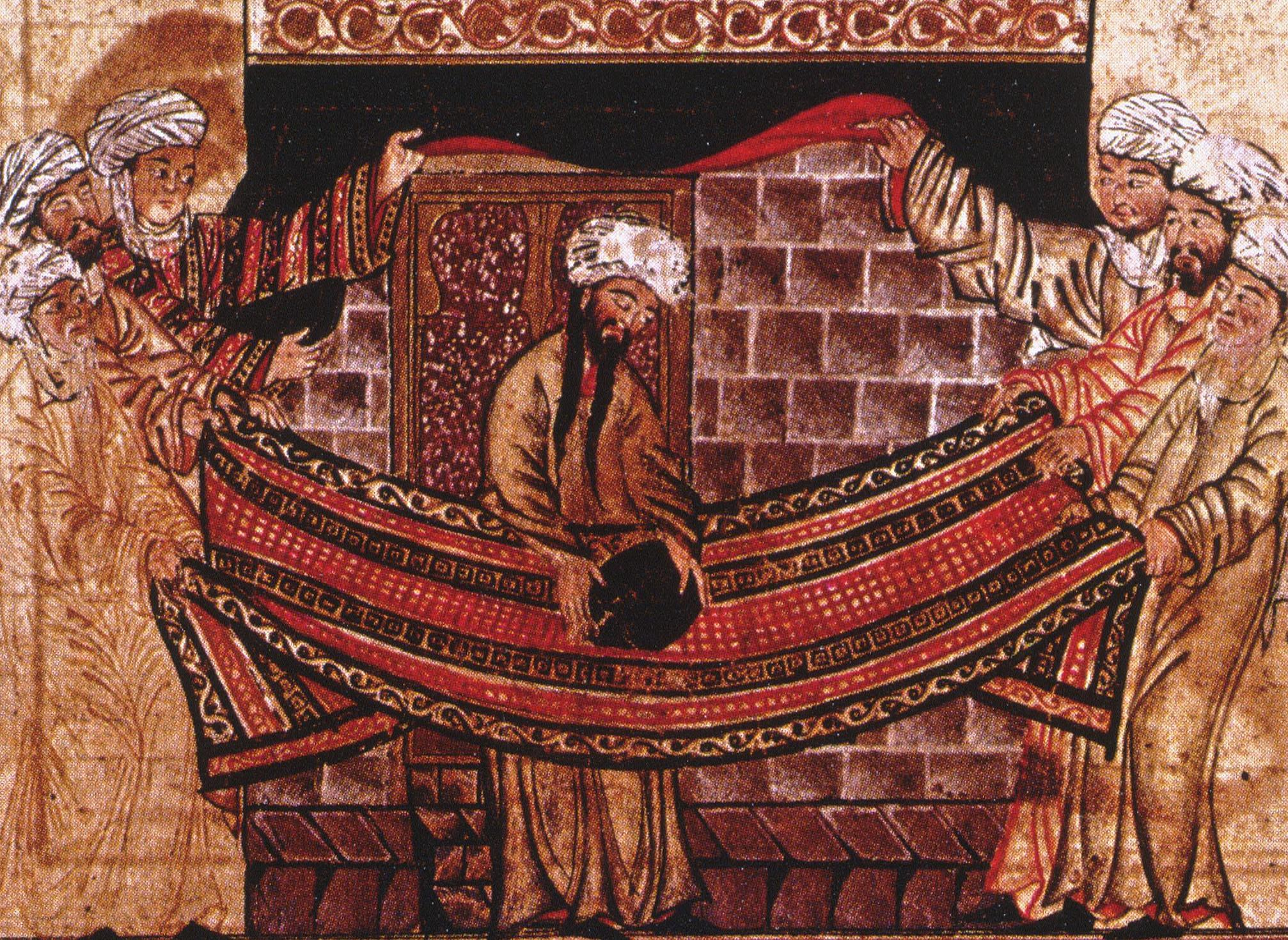
Miniature of Muhammad rededicating the Black Stone at the Kaaba. From Jami Al-Tawarikh, c. 1315

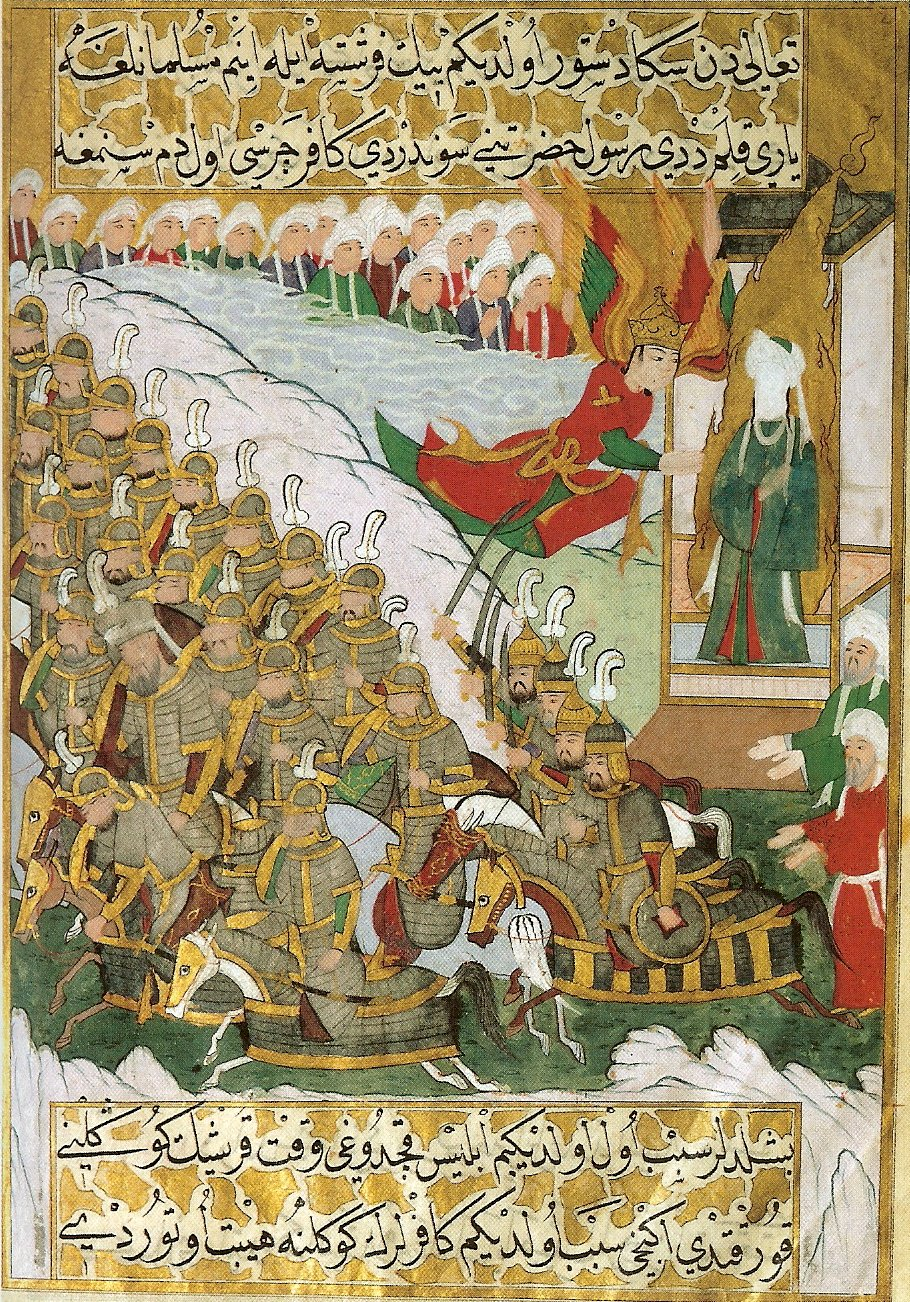
Muhammad at the Battle of Badr. From the Siyer-i Nebi, c. 1388.

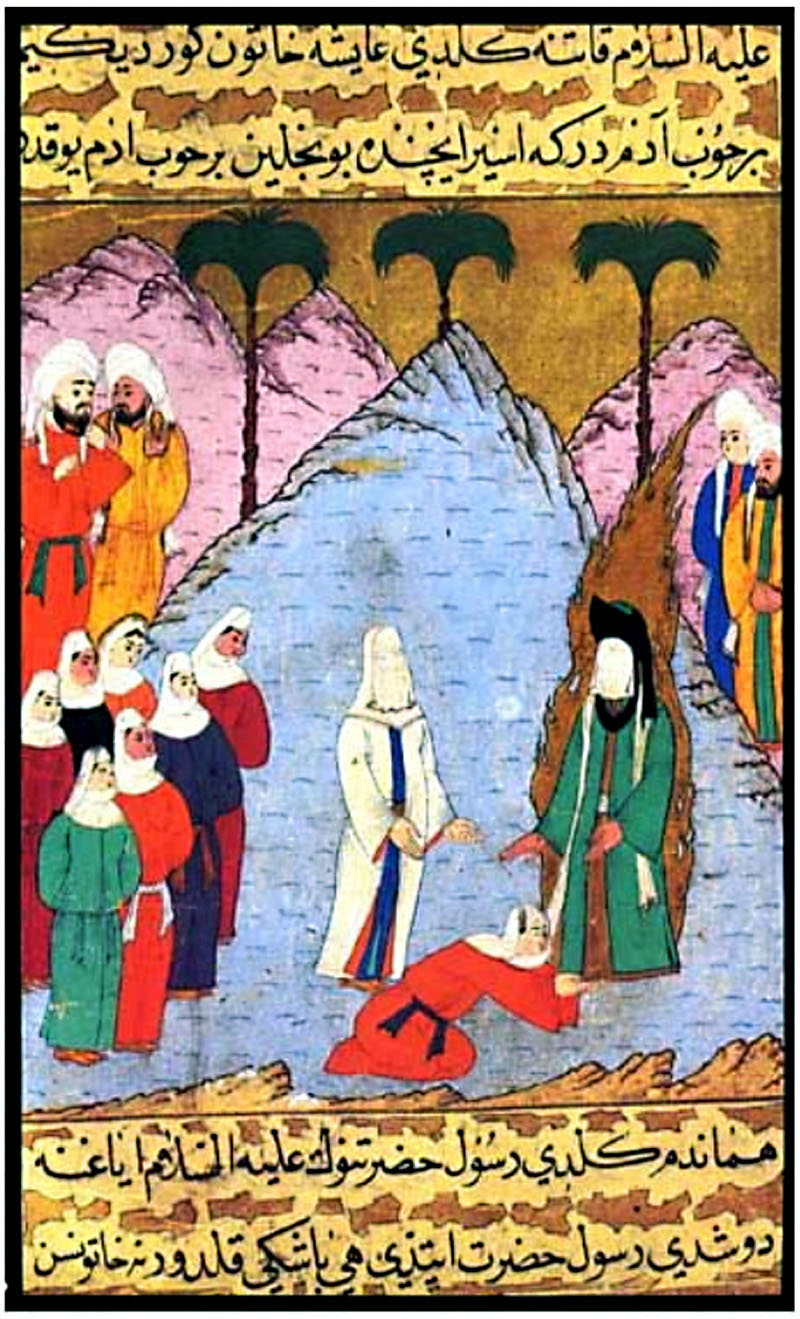
Muhammad and his wife Aisha freeing the daughter of a tribal chief. From the Siyer-i Nebi, c. 1388.

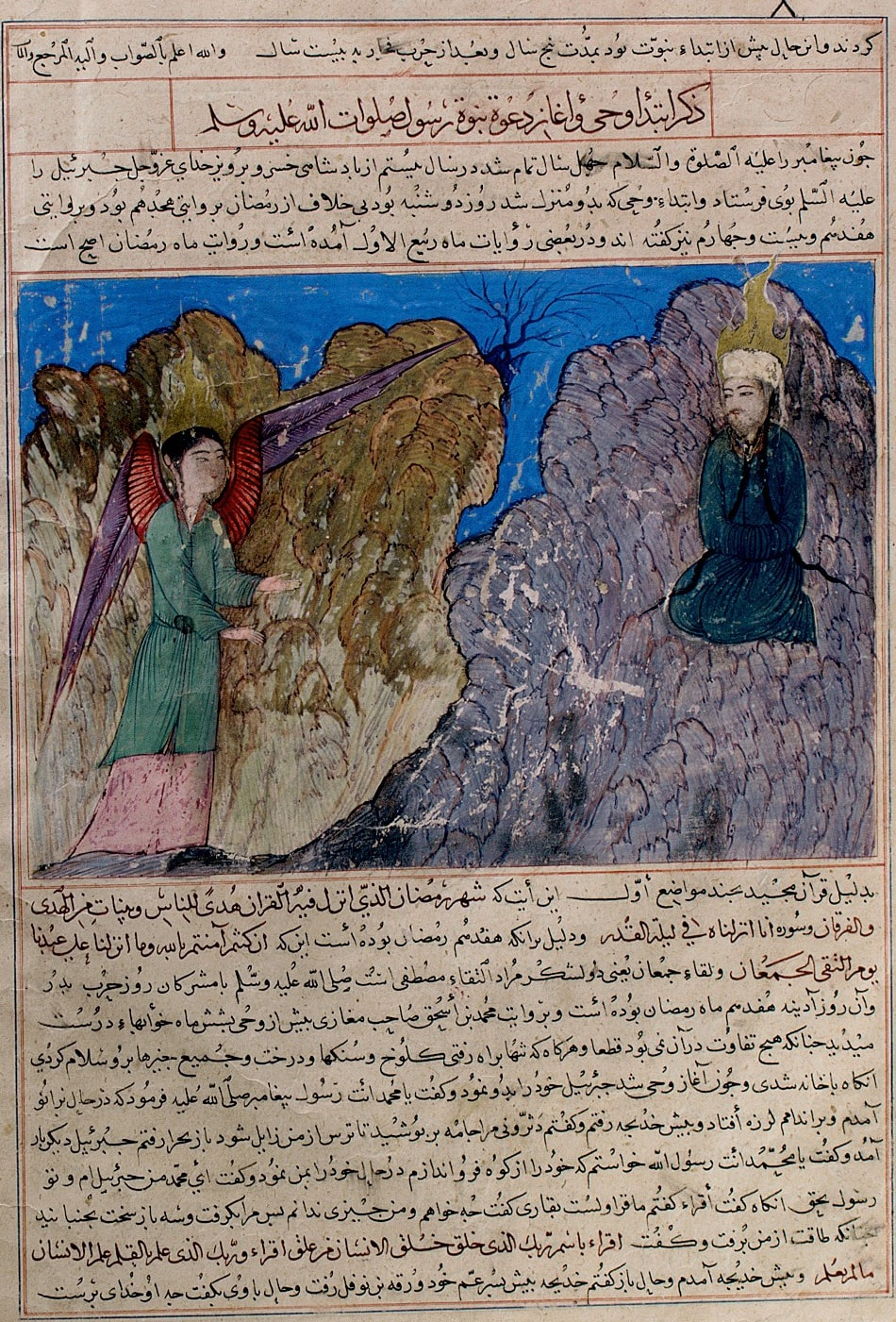
Muhammad's Call to Prophecy and the First Revelation; in the Majmac al-tawarikh (Compendium of Histories), Timurid, Herat, Afghanistan, Muhammad is shown with veiled face. c. 1425.

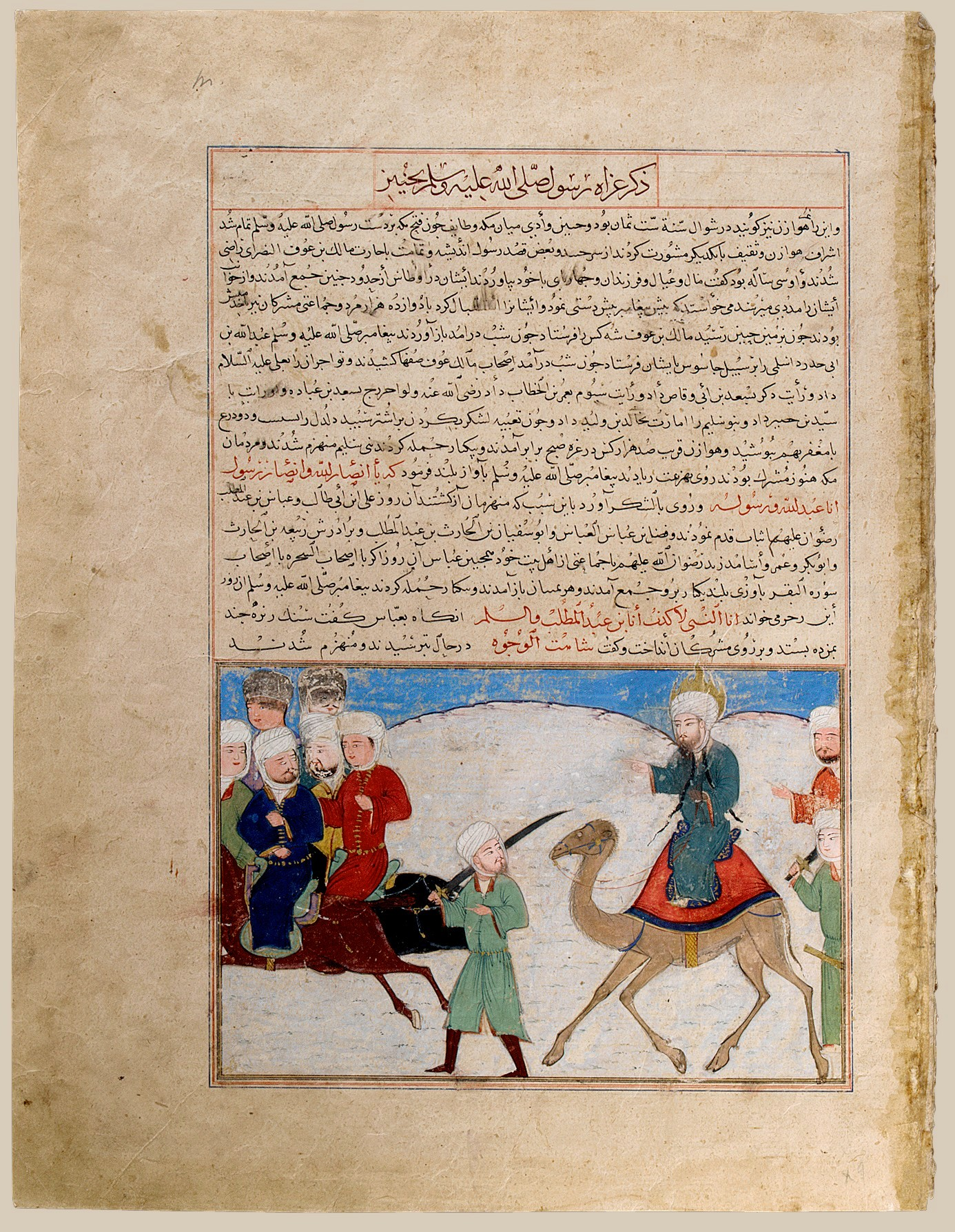
Journey of the Prophet Muhammad in the Majmac al-tawarikh (Compendium of Histories), Timurid. Herat, Afghanistan, c. 1425.

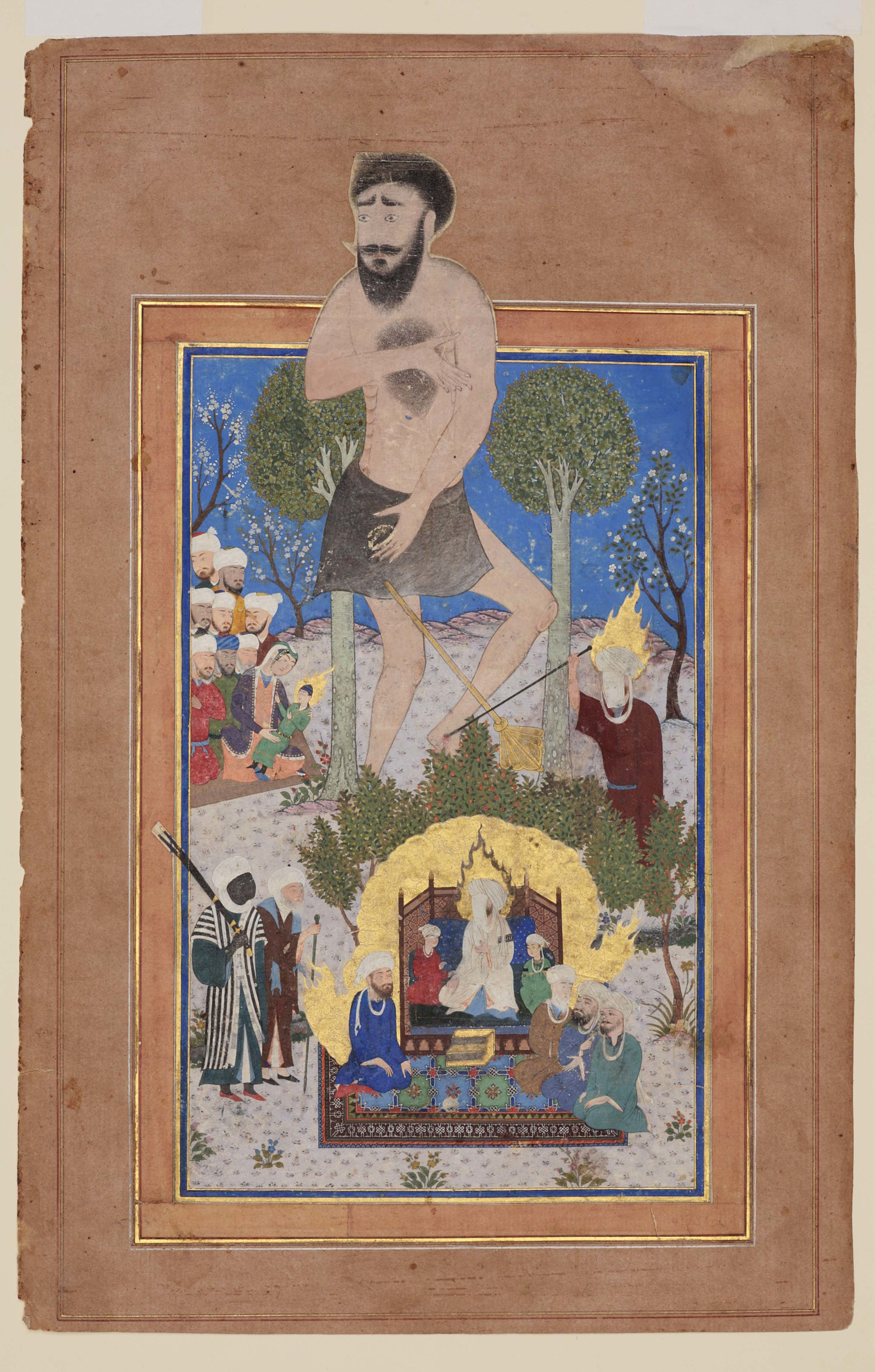
Musa va 'Uj, a painting showing Muhammad veiled, surrounded by his successors, and enclosed in a flaming nimbus, 1460s

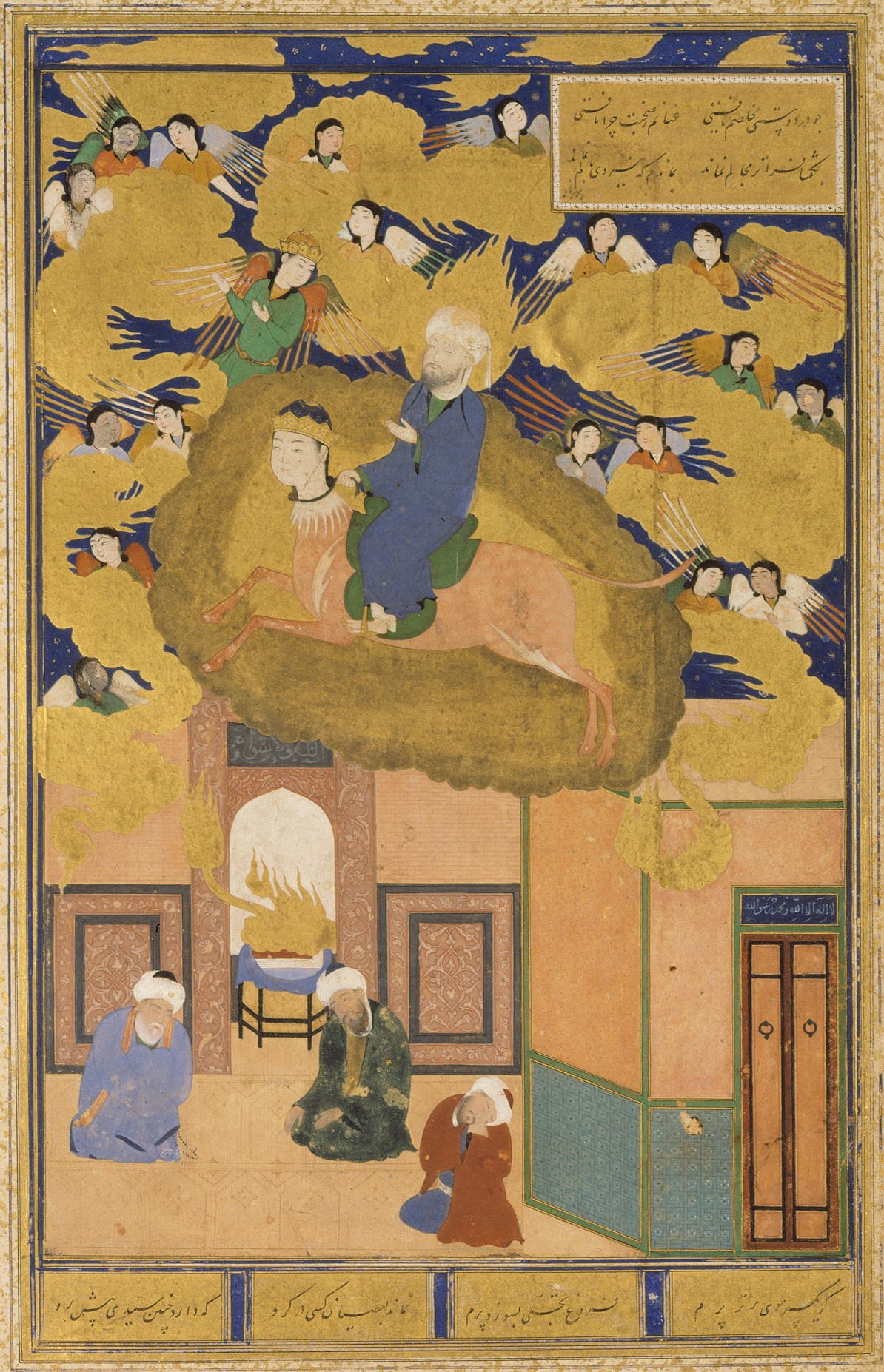
Muhammad's ascent into the Heavens, a journey known as the Mi'raj, as depicted in a copy of the Bostan of Saadi, 1514

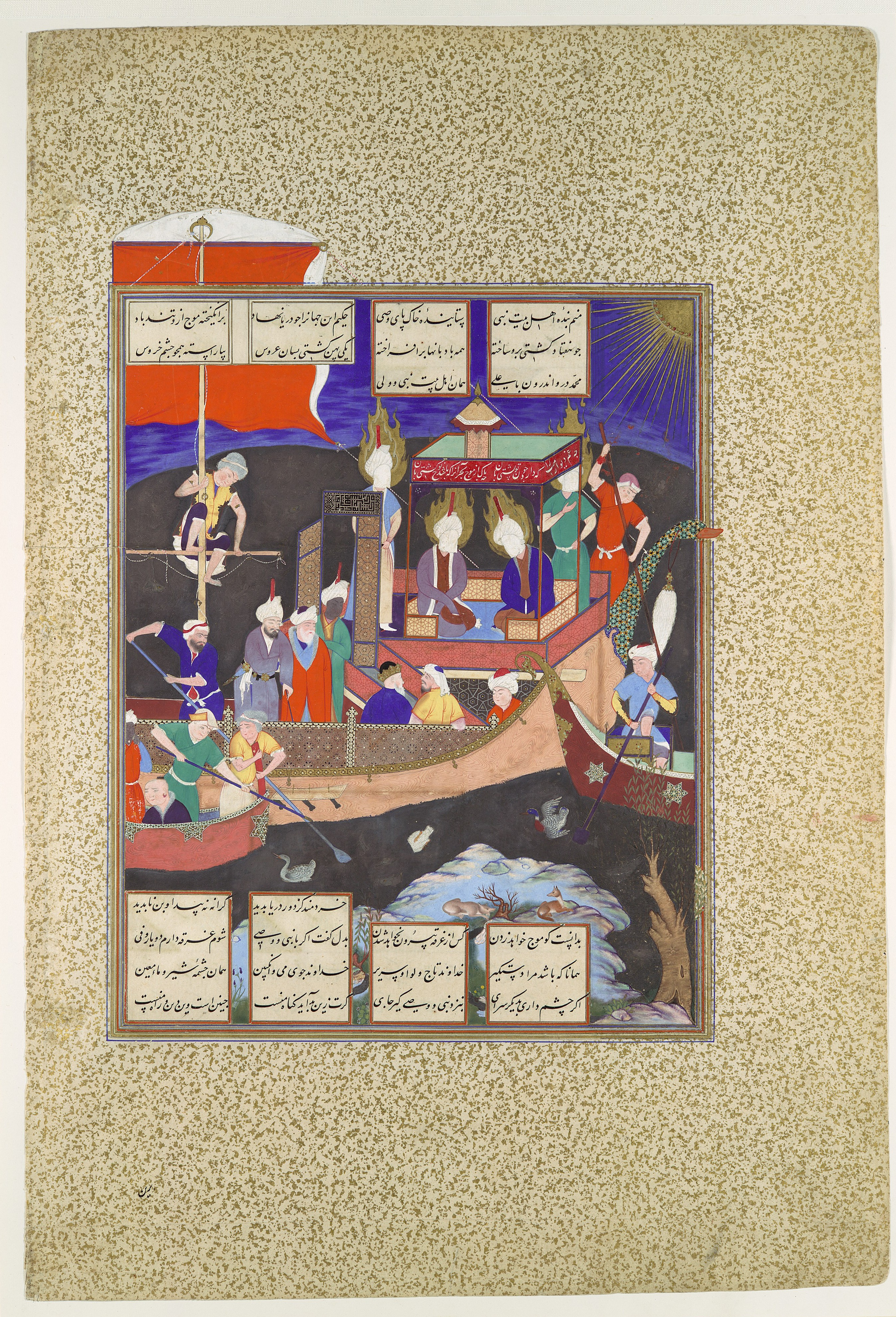
An image from the Houghton Shahnameh (Metropolitan Museum of Art), dated 1530 - 1535

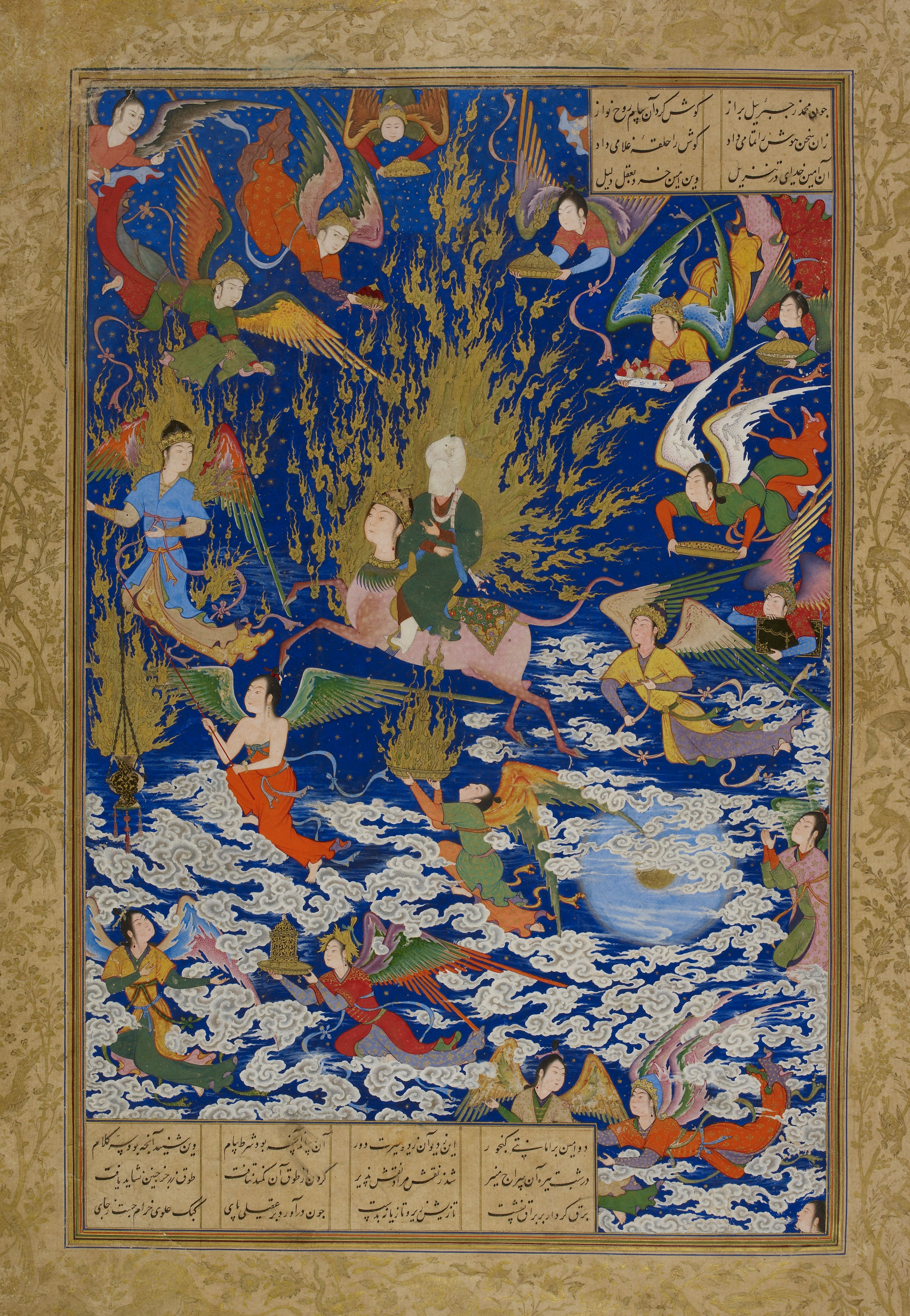
A miraj image, reflecting the new, Safavid convention of depicting Muhammad veiled, dated 1539 - 1543

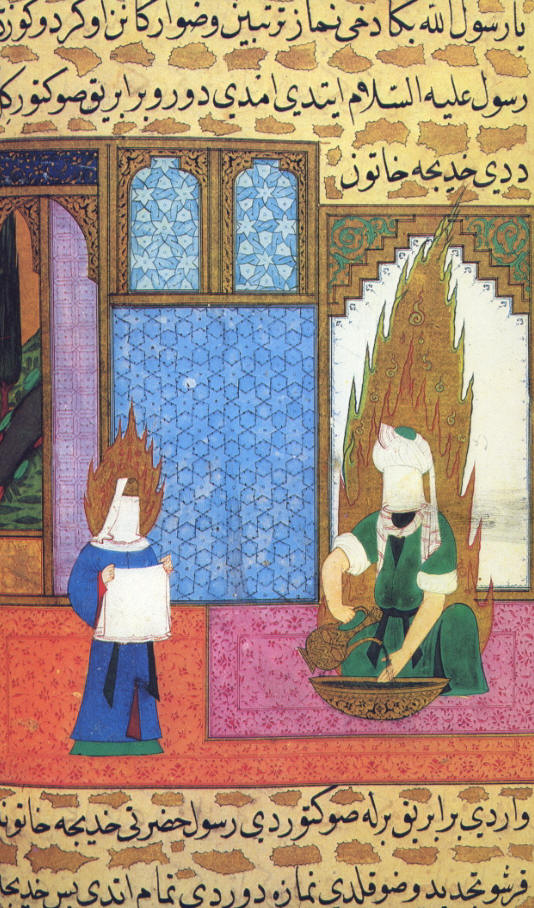
Muhammad and Khadija performing the first wudu, as illustrated in the Siyer-i Nebi, c. 1594

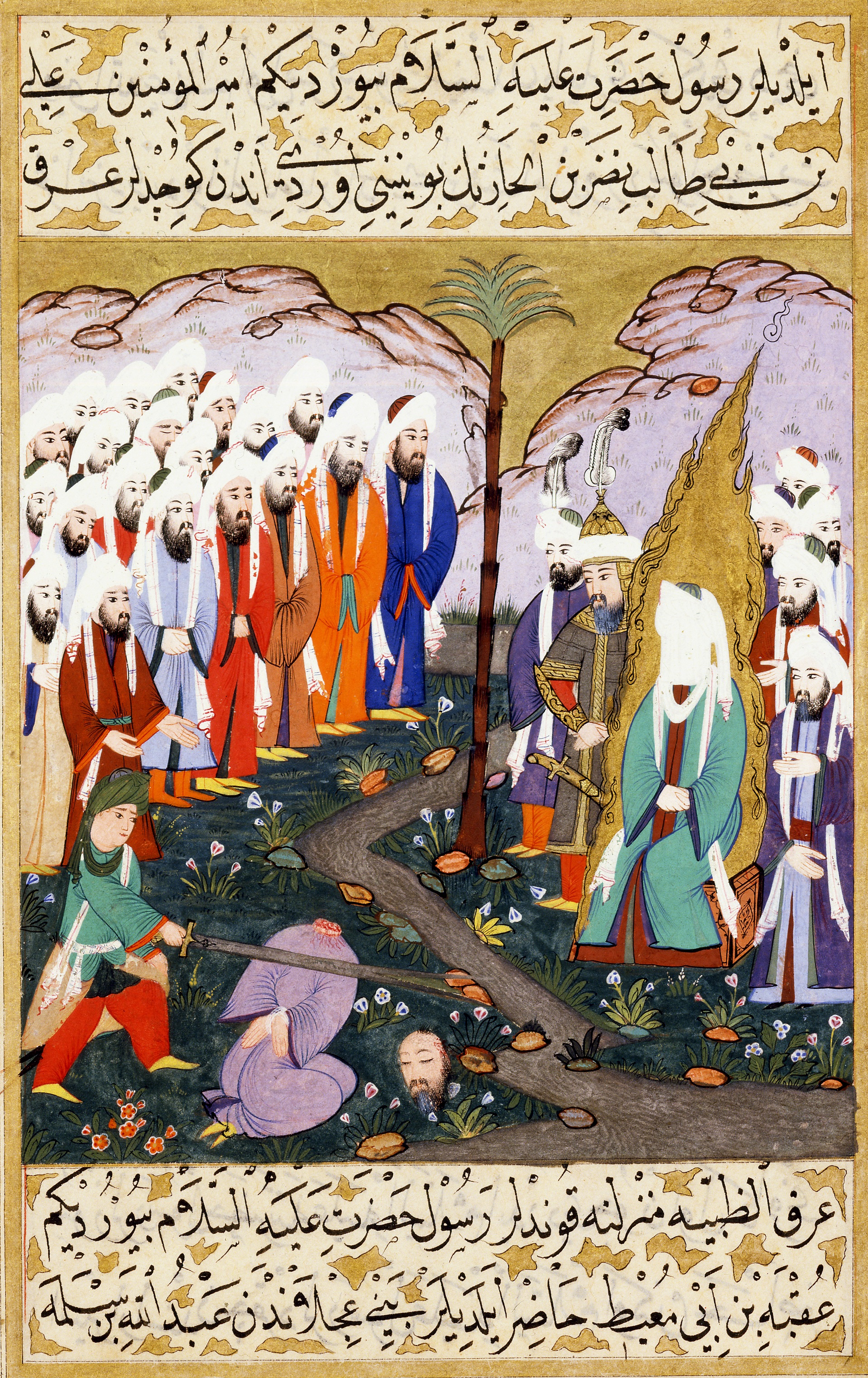
Ali beheading Nadr ibn al-Harith in the presence of Muhammad and his companions. From the Siyer-i Nebi, 1594.

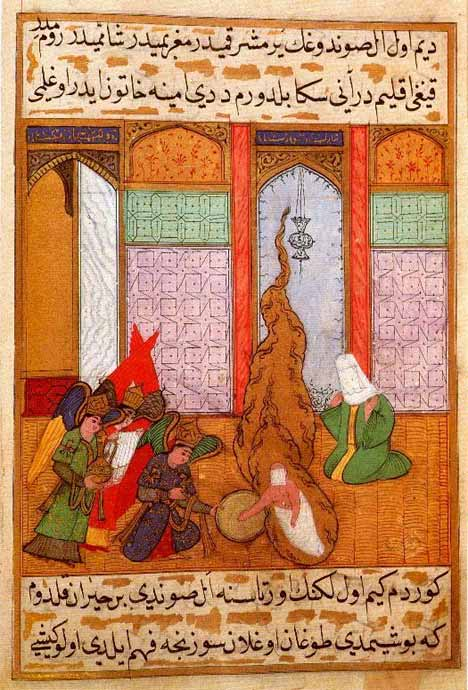
Birth of Muhammad, from Siyer-i Nebi, an Ottoman manuscript, probably by Nakkaş Osman, 1595

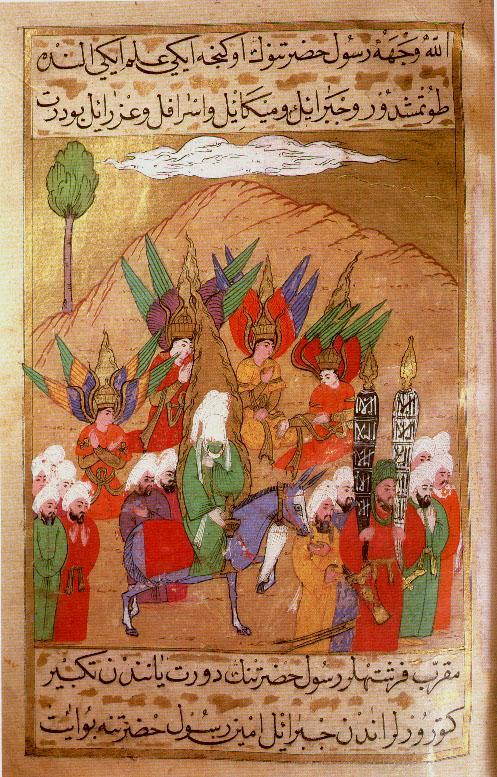
Muhammad advancing on Mecca, with the angels Gabriel, Michael, Israfil and Azrail, 1595

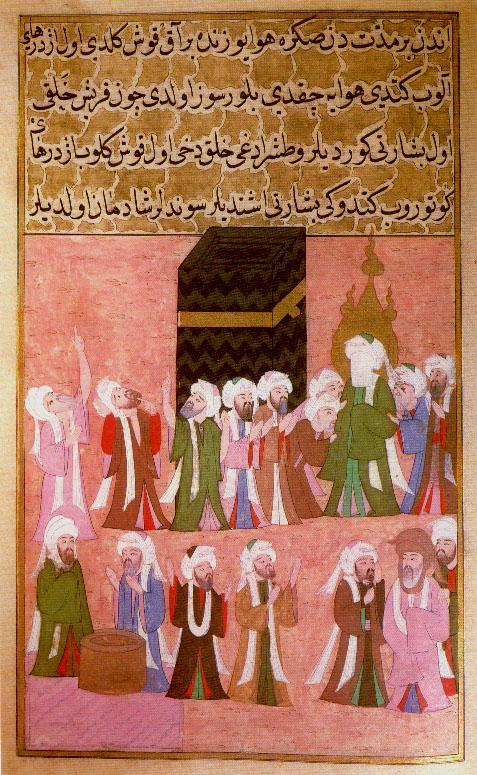
Muhammad removes a dragon from the Kaaba. From the Siyer-i Nebi, c. 1595.

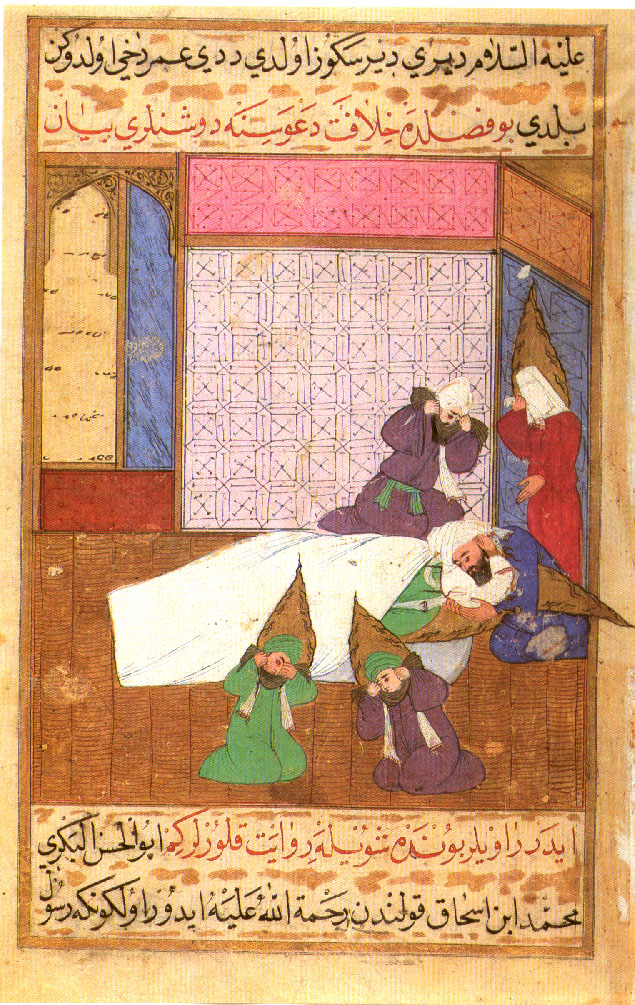
The death of Muhammad. From the Siyer-i Nebi, c. 1595.

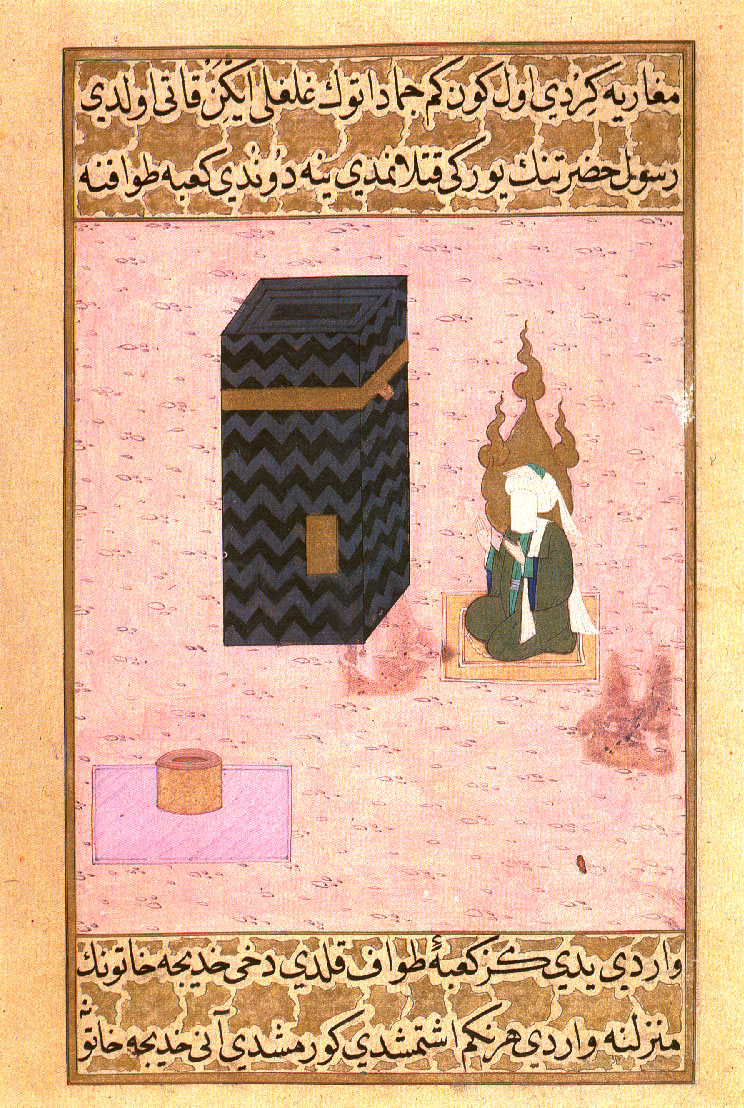
"Muhammad at the Ka'ba" from the Siyer-i Nebi. Muhammad is shown with veiled face, c. 1595.

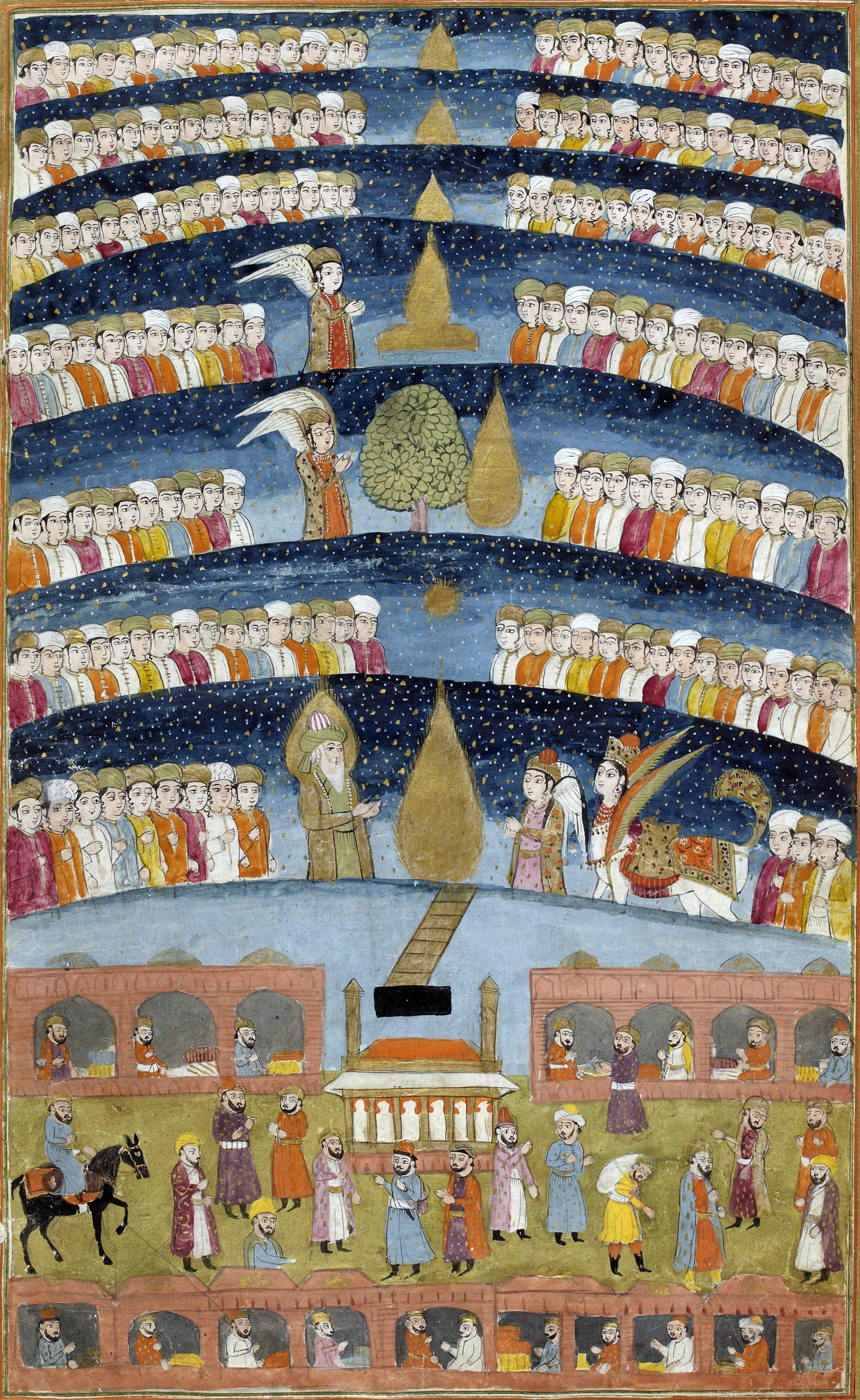
Islamic miniature depicting Muhammad's visit to Paradise, BnF, Kashmir, 1808

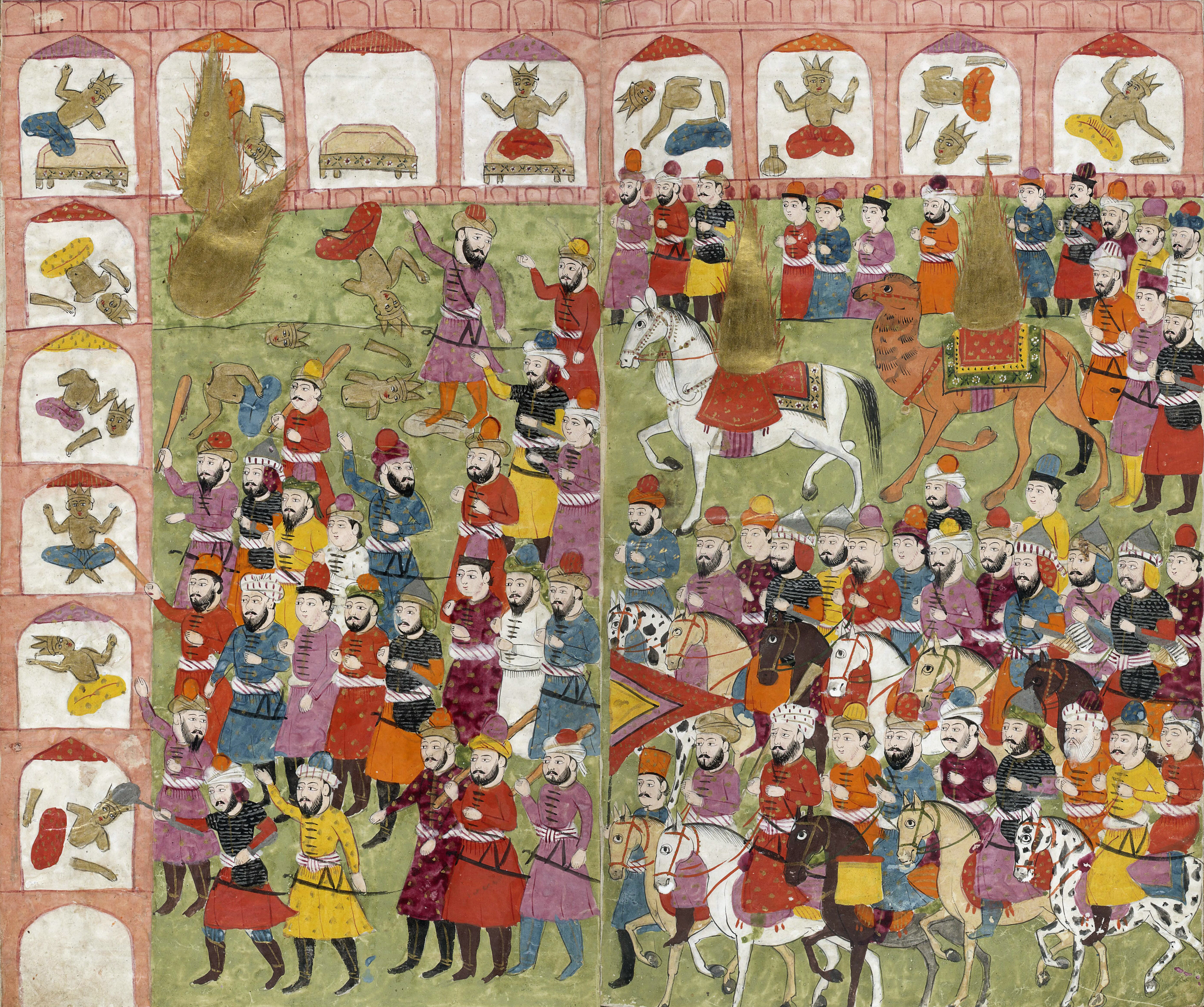
The destruction of idols at the Kaaba. Muhammad and Ali are represented as a flaming aureole. From Hamla-i haydarî ("Haydar's Battle"), Kashmir, 1808.

=== Contemporary Iran ===
Despite the avoidance of the representation of Muhammad in Sunni Islam, images of Muhammad are not uncommon in Iran. The Iranian Shi'ism seems more tolerant on this point than Sunnite orthodoxy. In Iran, depictions have considerable acceptance to the present day, and may be found in the modern forms of the poster and postcard.

Since the late 1990s, experts in Islamic iconography discovered images, printed on paper in Iran, portraying Muhammad as a teenager wearing a turban. There are several variants, all show the same juvenile face, identified by an inscription such as "Muhammad, the Messenger of God", or a more detailed legend referring to an episode in the life of Muhammad and the supposed origin of the image. Some Iranian versions of these posters attributed the original depiction to Bahira, a Christian monk who met the young Muhammad in Syria. By crediting the image to a Christian and predating it to the time before Muhammad became a prophet, the manufacturers of the image exonerate themselves from any wrongdoing.

The motif was taken from a photograph of a young Tunisian taken by the Germans Rudolf Franz Lehnert and Ernst Heinrich Landrock in 1905 or 1906, which had been printed in high editions on picture post cards till 1921. This depiction has been popular in Iran as a form of curiosity. In Tehran, a mural depicting the prophet – his face veiled – riding Buraq was installed at a public road intersection in 2008, the only mural of its kind in a Muslim-majority country.

=== Cinema ===
Very few films have been made about Muhammad. The 1976 film The Message told the story of his life without ever depicting him directly. While unseen, Muhammad is quoted, addressed directly and discussed throughout the film, and a distinct organ music cue signifies his off-camera presence. Most members of his family were also not depicted, leaving figures such as Hamza, Bilal and Abu Sufyan as on-screen protagonists to advance the story.

A devotional cartoon called Muhammad: The Last Prophet was released in 2004. An Iranian film directed by Majid Majidi was released in 2015 named Muhammad. It is the first part of the trilogy film series on Muhammad by Majid Majidi.

While Sunni Muslims have always explicitly prohibited the depiction of Muhammad on film, contemporary Shi'a scholars have taken a more relaxed attitude, stating that it is permissible to depict Muhammad, even in television or movies, if done with respect.

== Depiction by non-Muslims ==
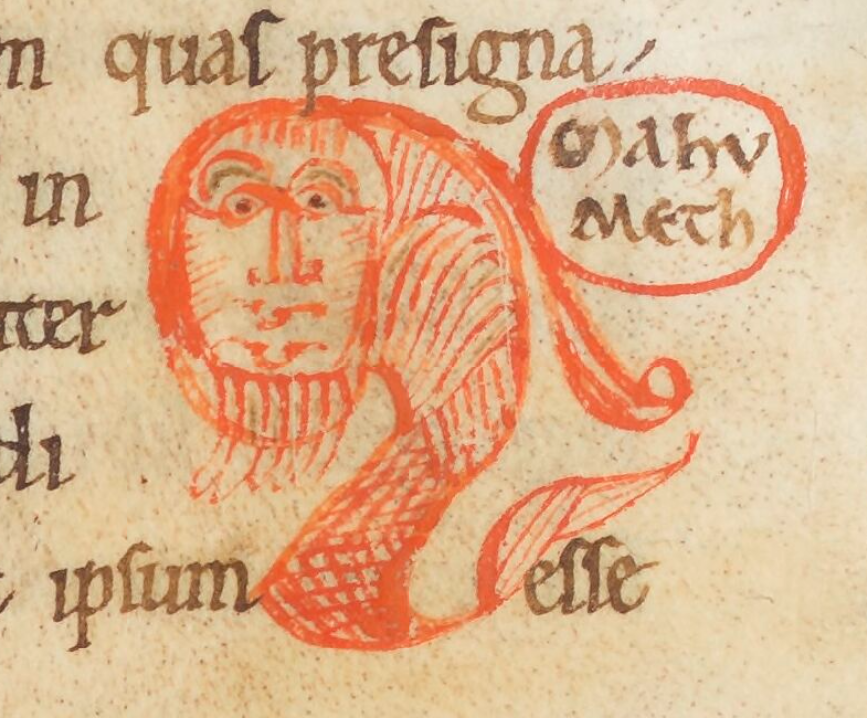
The earliest depiction of Muhammad in the West, Corpus Cluniacense, 12th century

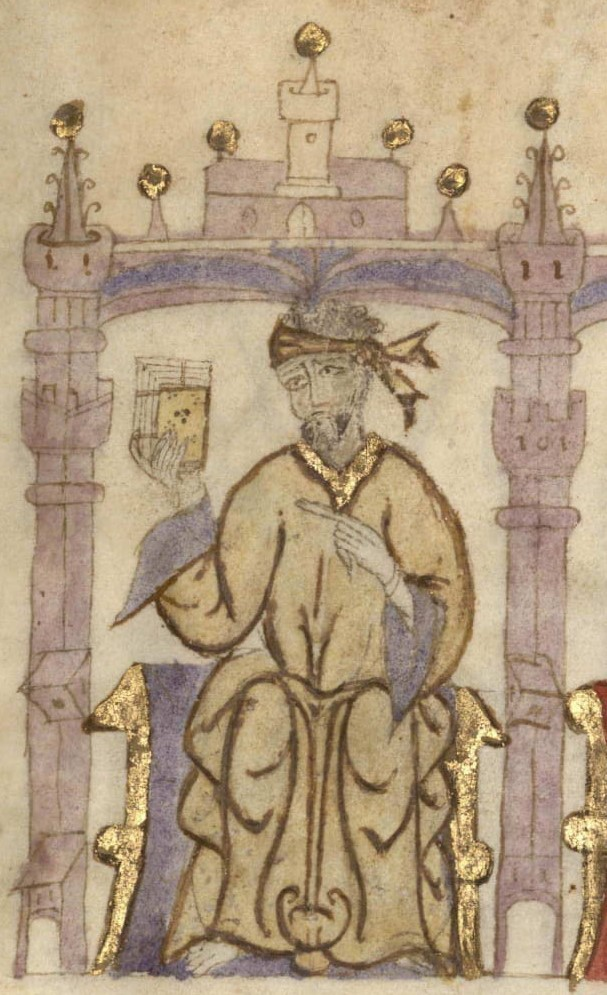
Muhammad depicted in the medieval Semblanzas de reyes, c. 1320

The earliest depiction of Muhammad in the West is found in a 12th-century manuscript of the Corpus Cluniacense, tied to Hermann of Carinthia's introduction to his translation of the Kitab al-Anwar of Abu al-Hasan Bakri. The image is intentionally defamatory, portraying Muhammad with a bearded human face and a fish-like body. It is perhaps inspired by Horace's Ars poetica, wherein the poet imagines "a woman, lovely above, foully ended in an ugly fish below" and asks if you would "restrain your laughter, my friends, if admitted to this private view?", a passage alluded to by Peter the Venerable in his account of Islam in the Corpus. This depiction, however, did not set the paradigm for later depictions.

Western representations of Muhammad were very rare until the explosion of images following the invention of the printing press; he is shown in a few medieval images, normally in an unflattering manner, often influenced by his brief mention in Dante's Divine Comedy. Dante placed Muhammad in the Eighth Circle of Hell, with his entrails hanging out (Canto 28):

No barrel, not even one where the hoops and staves go every which way, was ever split open like one frayed Sinner I saw, ripped from chin to where we fart below.
His guts hung between his legs and displayed His vital organs, including that wretched sack Which converts to shit whatever gets conveyed down the gullet.
As I stared at him he looked back And with his hands pulled his chest open, Saying, "See how I split open the crack in myself! See how twisted and broken Muhammad is! Before me walks Ali, his face Cleft from chin to crown, grief–stricken."

This scene was sometimes shown in illustrations of the Divina Commedia before modern times. Muhammad is represented in a 15th-century fresco Last Judgement by Giovanni da Modena and drawing on Dante, in the Church of San Petronio, Bologna, Italy and artwork by Salvador Dalí, Auguste Rodin, William Blake, and Gustave Doré.

Muhammad sometimes figures in Western depictions of groups of influential people in world history. Such depictions tend to be favourable or neutral in intent; one example can be found at the United States Supreme Court building in Washington, D.C. Created in 1935, the frieze includes major historical lawgivers, and places Muhammad alongside Hammurabi, Moses, Confucius, and others. In 1997, a controversy erupted surrounding the frieze, and tourist materials have since been edited to describe the depiction as "a well-intentioned attempt by the sculptor to honor Muhammad" that "bears no resemblance to Muhammad."

In 1955, a statue of Muhammad was removed from a courthouse in New York City after the ambassadors of Indonesia, Pakistan, and Egypt requested its removal.

In 1997, the Council on American–Islamic Relations, a Muslim advocacy group in the United States, wrote to United States Supreme Court Chief Justice William Rehnquist requesting that the sculpted representation of Muhammad on the north frieze inside the Supreme Court building be removed or sanded down. The court rejected CAIR's request.

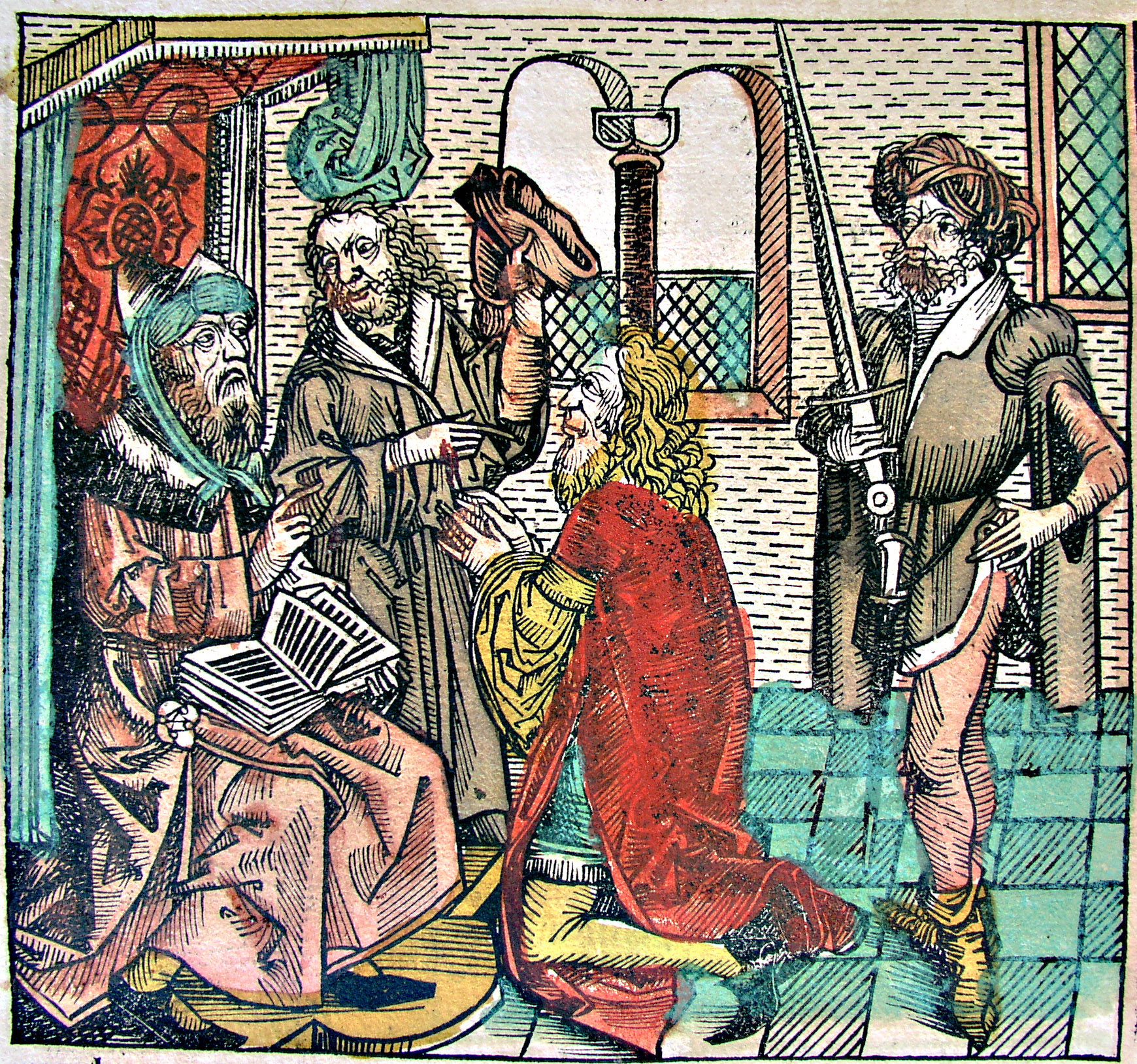
Muhammad, seated on the left, possibly reading from the Quran, as depicted in the 15th century Nuremberg Chronicle

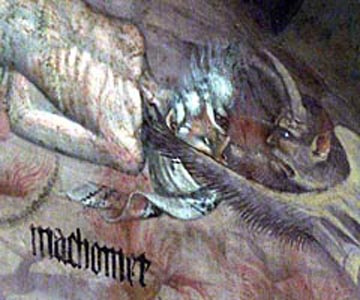
Early Renaissance fresco illustrating Dante's Inferno. Muhammad is depicted being dragged down to Hell.

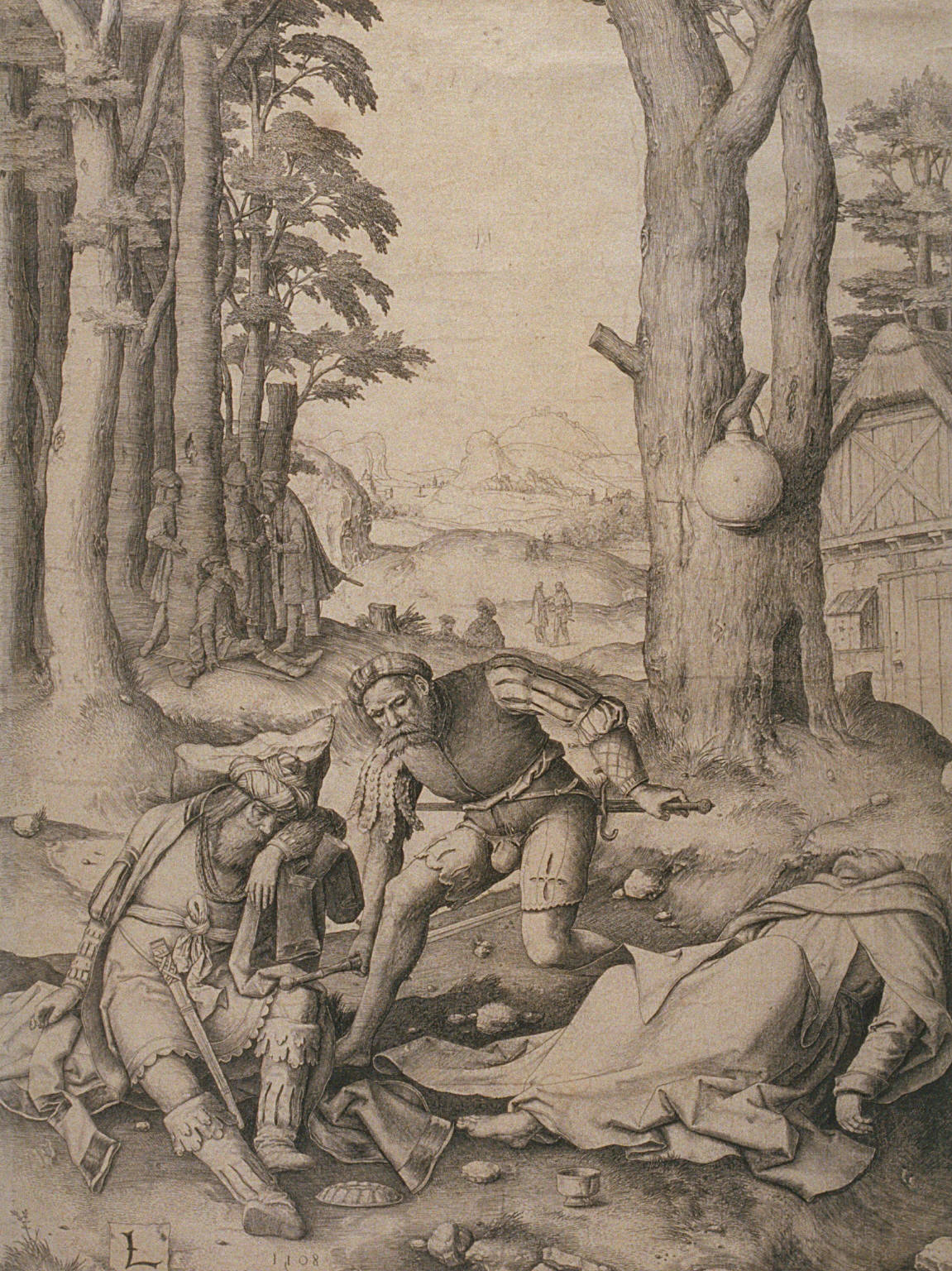
Muhammed and the Monk Sergius (Bahira). This 1508 engraving by the Dutch artist Lucas van Leyden shows a legend that circulated in Europe.

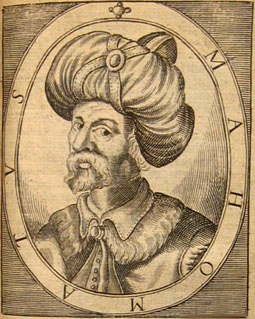
Portrait of Muhammad as a generic "Easterner", from the PANSEBEIA, or A View of all Religions in the World by Alexander Ross (1683)

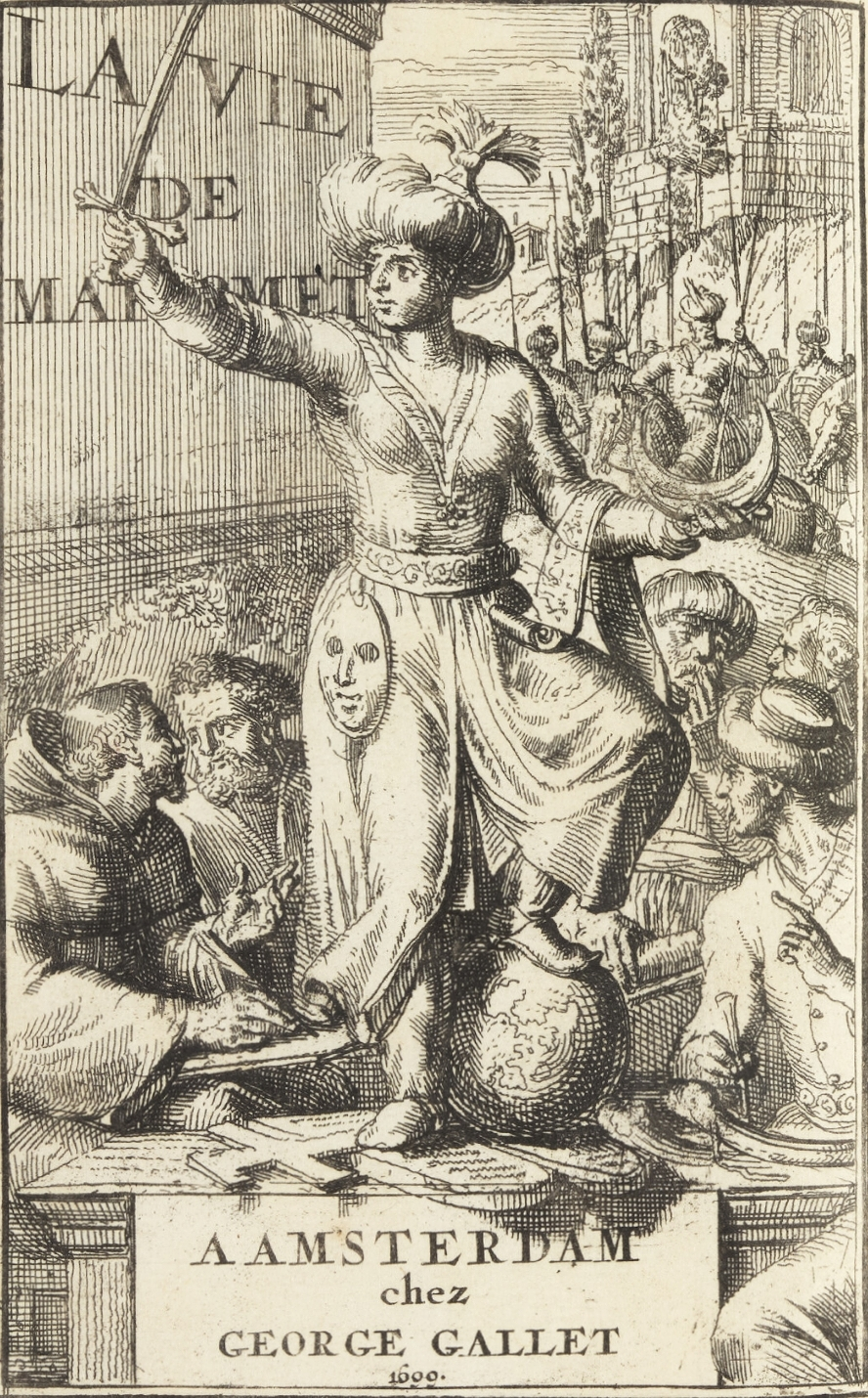
Illustration from La vie de Mahomet, by M. Prideaux, published in 1699. It shows Muhammad holding a sword and a crescent while trampling on a globe, a cross, and the Ten Commandments.

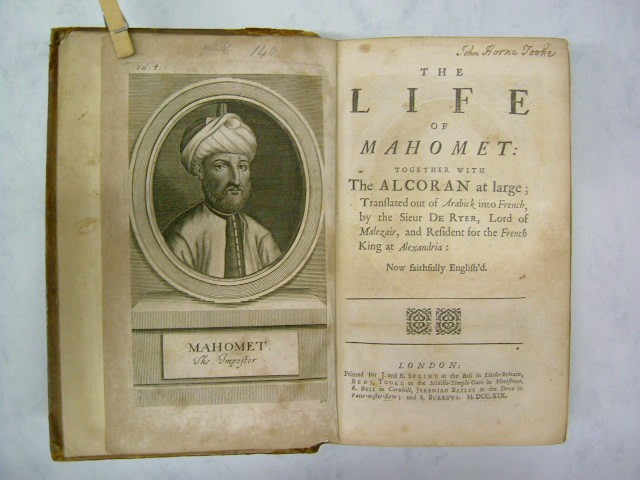
An engraving of Muhammad in The Life of Mahomet (1719)

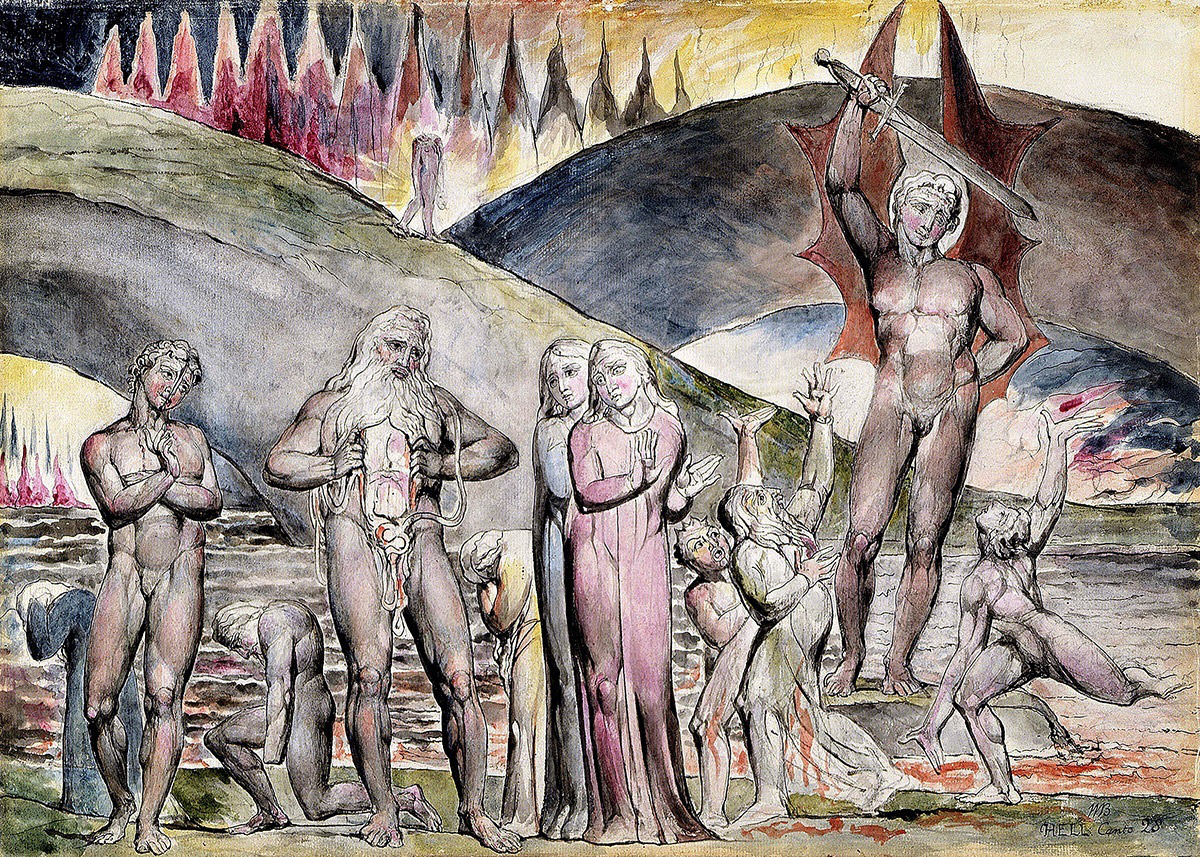
William Blake, Muhammad pulling his chest open in an illustration to Dante's Inferno (1827)

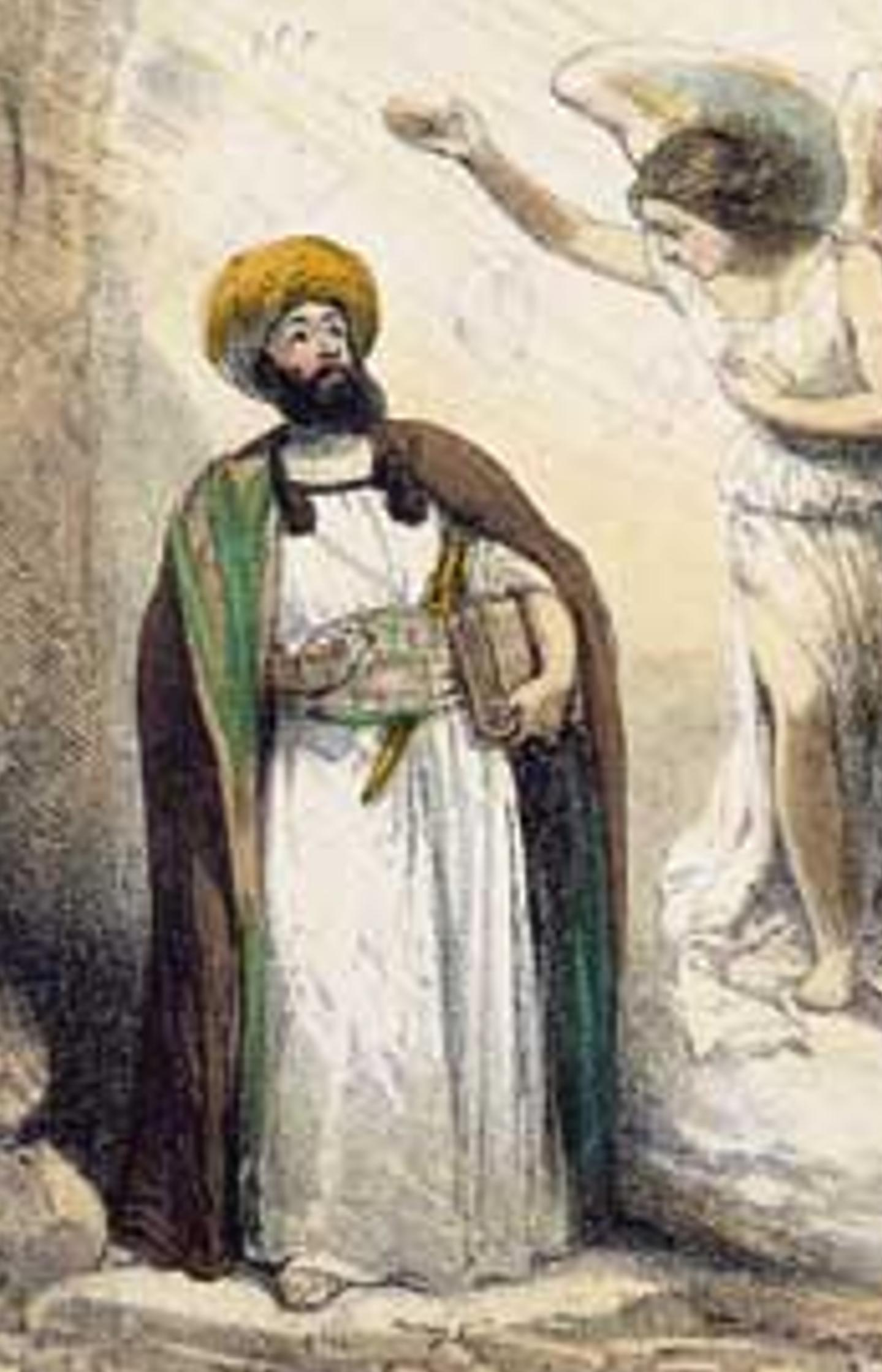
Die Berufung Mohammeds durch den Engel Gabriel by Theodor Hosemann, 1847: Muhammad receiving the words of God from Gabriel in the cave of Hira

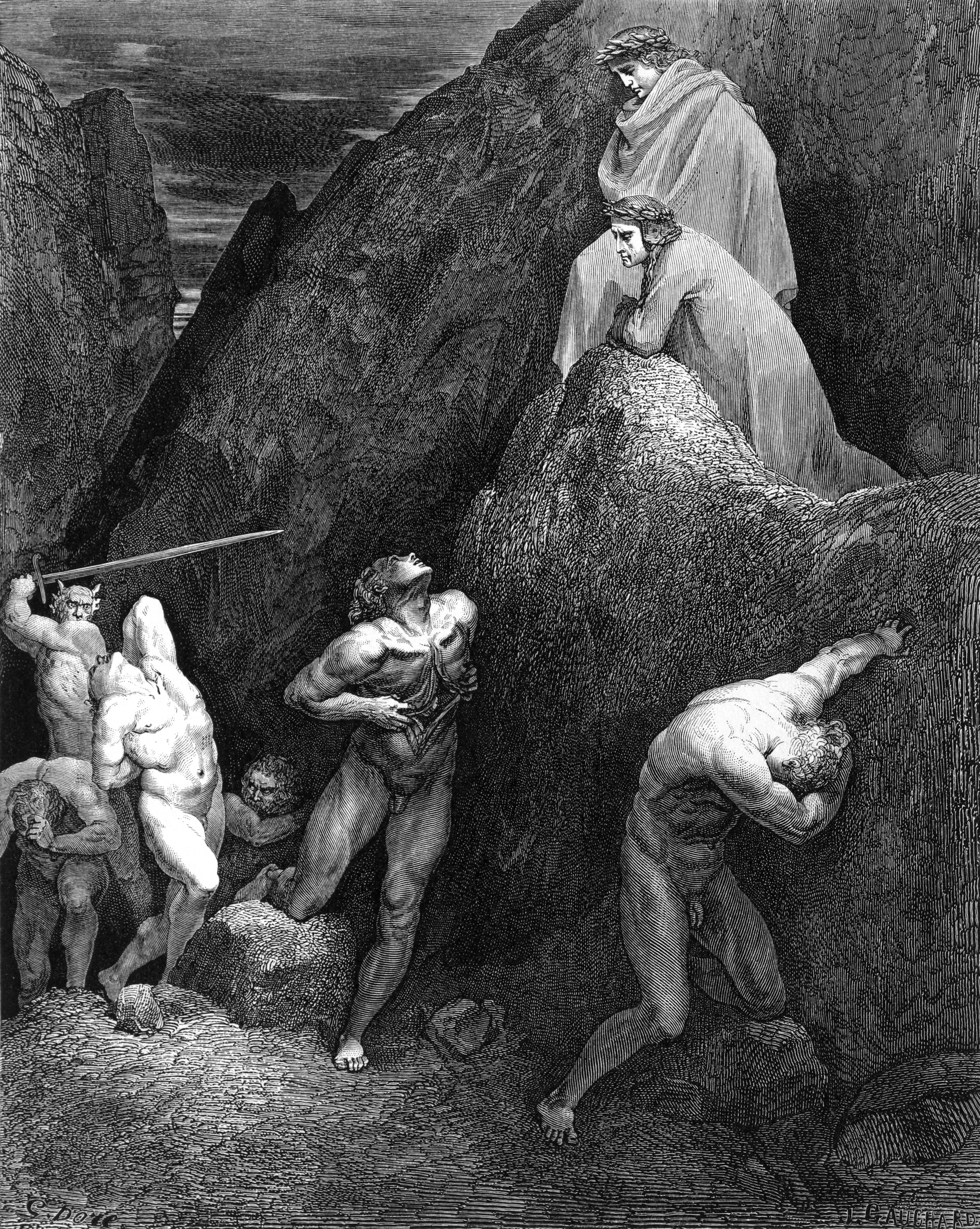
Muhammad suffering punishment in Hell. From Gustave Doré's illustrations of the Divine Comedy (1861)

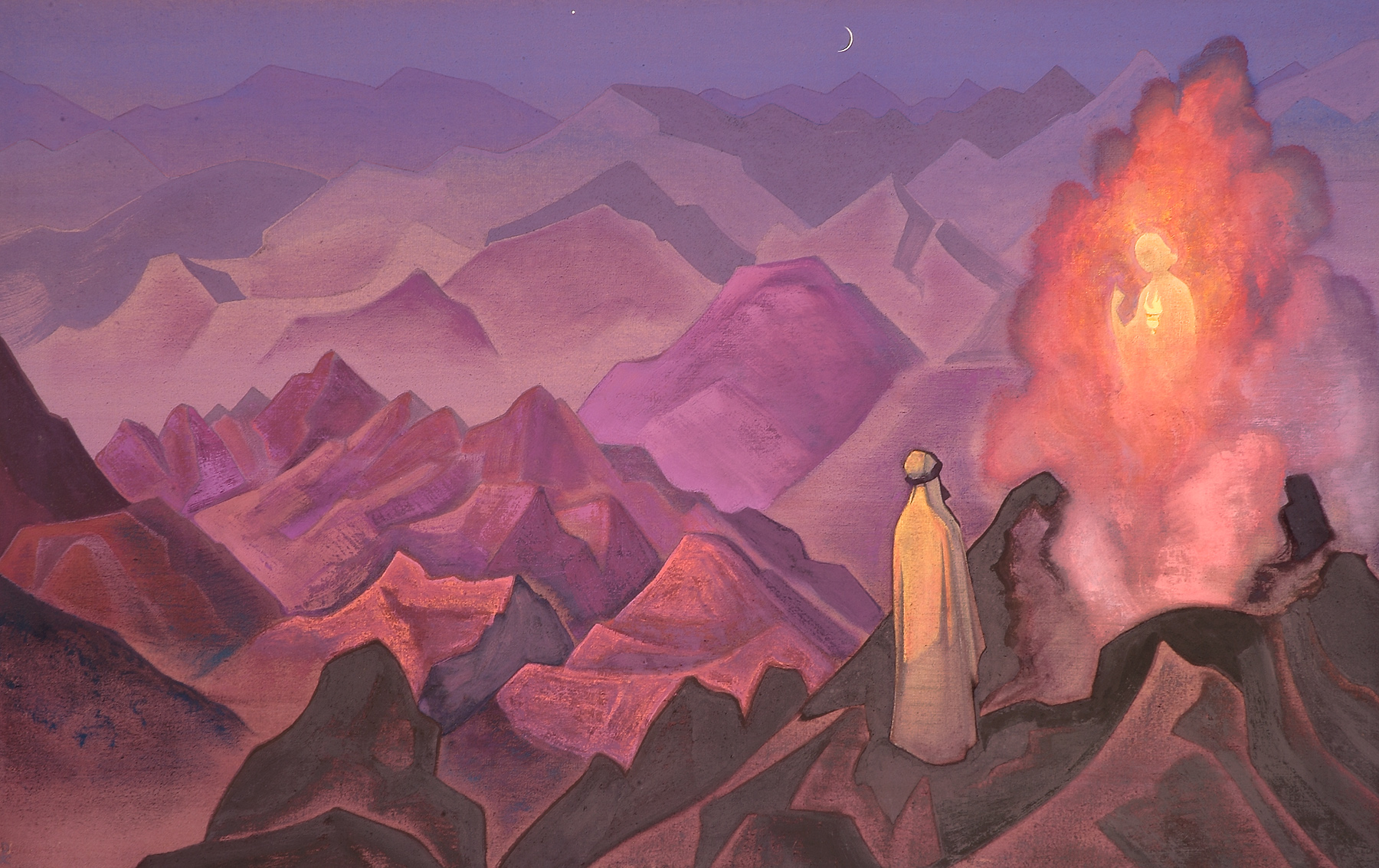
Пророк Магомет (Mohammed the Prophet) by Nicholas Roerich, 1925

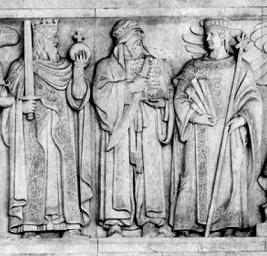
Muhammad as depicted by sculptor Adolph Weinman on the U.S. Supreme Court building in Washington, DC carrying a sword and the Quran, 1930s

== Controversies in the 20th and 21st centuries ==
The 20th and 21st centuries have been marked by controversies over depictions of Muhammad, not only for contemporary caricatures or cartoons, but also regarding the display of historical artwork.

In a story on morals at the end of the millennium in December 1999, the German news magazine Der Spiegel printed on the same page pictures of “moral apostles” Muhammad, Jesus, Confucius, and Immanuel Kant. In the subsequent weeks, the magazine received protests, petitions and threats against publishing the picture of Muhammad. The Turkish TV-station Show TV broadcast the telephone number of an editor who then received daily calls.

Nadeem Elyas, leader of the Central Council of Muslims in Germany said that the picture should not be printed again in order to avoid hurting the feelings of Muslims intentionally. Elyas recommended whitening the face of Muhammad instead.

In June 2001, the Spiegel with consideration of Islamic laws published a picture of Muhammed with a whitened face on its title page. The same picture of Muhammad by Hosemann had been published by the magazine once before in 1998 in a special edition on Islam, but then without evoking similar protests.

In 2002, Italian police reported that they had disrupted a terrorist plot to destroy the Church of San Petronio in Bologna, which contains a 15th-century fresco depicting an image of Muhammad being dragged to hell by a demon (see above).

Examples of depictions of Muhammad being altered include a 1940 mural at the University of Utah having the name of Muhammad removed from beneath the painting in 2000 at the request of Muslim students.

=== Sketch in Senang magazine ===
In 1990, the Indonesian magazine Senang published a letter to the editor by a reader who claimed to have dreamed of Muhammad. The letter was accompanied by a sketch by the magazine's resident artist featuring a "turbaned, faceless figure." No major repercussions immediately followed. However, soon afterwards, there was a separate controversy in which a Christian-owned Indonesian magazine named Monitor published the results of a readers' poll about "most-admired leaders" that put Suharto at number 1 and Muhammad at number 11. The wake of this scandal led to a crackdown on "insulting Muhammad" in general, and so police announced they were investigating Senang and would attempt to track down the author of the letter. Before anything further could happen, Senang voluntarily offered to cease publication.

Jyllands-Posten's controversial cartoons of Muhammad from September 2005

=== Jyllands-Posten Muhammad cartoons controversy ===
In 2005, Danish newspaper Jyllands-Posten published a set of editorial cartoons, many of which depicted Muhammad. In late 2005 and early 2006, Danish Muslim organizations ignited the Jyllands-Posten Muhammad cartoons controversy through public protests and by spreading knowledge of the publication of the cartoons. According to John Woods, Islamic history professor at the University of Chicago, it was not simply the depiction of Muhammad that was offensive, but the implication that Muhammad was somehow a supporter of terrorism. In Sweden, an online caricature competition was announced in support of Jyllands-Posten, but Foreign Affairs Minister Laila Freivalds and the Swedish Security Service pressured the internet service provider to shut the page down. In 2006, when her involvement was revealed to the public, she had to resign. On 12 February 2008 the Danish police arrested three men alleged to be involved in a plot to assassinate Kurt Westergaard, one of the cartoonists.

Muhammad in the 2001 South Park episode "Super Best Friends". He was intended to re-appear in "Cartoon Wars", but was removed due to controversies regarding Muhammad cartoons in European newspapers. The episodes "200" and "201" satirized censorship of Muhammad’s image. All of these episodes have been removed from streaming services.

=== South Park ===
In 2006, the controversial American animated television comedy program South Park, which had previously depicted Muhammad as a superhero character in the July 4, 2001 episode "Super Best Friends" and has depicted Muhammad in the opening sequence since that episode, attempted to satirize the Danish newspaper incident. In the episode, "Cartoon Wars Part II", they intended to show Muhammad handing a salmon helmet to Peter Griffin, a character from the Fox animated series Family Guy. However, Comedy Central, who airs South Park, rejected the scene, citing concerns of violent protests in the Islamic world. The creators of South Park reacted by instead satirizing Comedy Central's double standard for broadcast acceptability by including a segment of "Cartoon Wars Part II" in which American president George W. Bush and Jesus defecate on the flag of the United States.

Everybody Draw Mohammed Day was a protest against those who threatened violence against artists who drew representations of Muhammad. It began as a protest against the action of Comedy Central in forbidding the broadcast of the South Park episode "201" in response to death threats against some of those responsible for the segment. Observance of the day began with a drawing posted on the Internet on April 20, 2010, accompanied by text suggesting that "everybody" create a drawing representing Muhammad, on May 20, 2010, as a protest against efforts to limit freedom of speech.

=== Lars Vilks Muhammad drawings controversy ===
The Lars Vilks Muhammad drawings controversy began in July 2007 with a series of drawings by Swedish artist Lars Vilks which depicted Muhammad as a roundabout dog. Several art galleries in Sweden declined to show the drawings, citing security concerns and fear of violence. The controversy gained international attention after the Örebro-based regional newspaper Nerikes Allehanda published one of the drawings on August 18 to illustrate an editorial on self-censorship and freedom of religion.

While several other leading Swedish newspapers had published the drawings already, this particular publication led to protests from Muslims in Sweden as well as official condemnations from several foreign governments including Iran, Pakistan, Afghanistan, Egypt and Jordan, as well as by the inter-governmental Organisation of the Islamic Conference (OIC). The controversy occurred about one and a half years after the Jyllands-Posten Muhammad cartoons controversy in Denmark in early 2006.

Another controversy emerged in September 2007 when Bangladeshi cartoonist Arifur Rahman was detained on suspicion of showing disrespect to Muhammad. The interim government confiscated copies of the Bengali-language Prothom Alo in which the drawings appeared. The cartoon consisted of a boy holding a cat conversing with an elderly man. The man asks the boy his name, and he replies "Babu". The older man chides him for not mentioning the name of Muhammad before his name. He then points to the cat and asks the boy what it is called, and the boy replies "Muhammad the cat".

The cartoon caused a firestorm in Bangladesh, with militant Islamists demanding that Rahman be executed for blasphemy. A group of people torched copies of the paper and several Islamic groups protested, saying the drawings ridiculed Muhammad and his companions. They demanded "exemplary punishment" for the paper's editor and the cartoonist. Bangladesh does not have a blasphemy law, although one had been demanded by the same fundamentalist Islamic groups.

=== Wikipedia article ===
In 2008, around 180,000 people, many of them Muslims, signed a petition protesting against the inclusion of Muhammad's depictions in the English Wikipedia's Muhammad article.

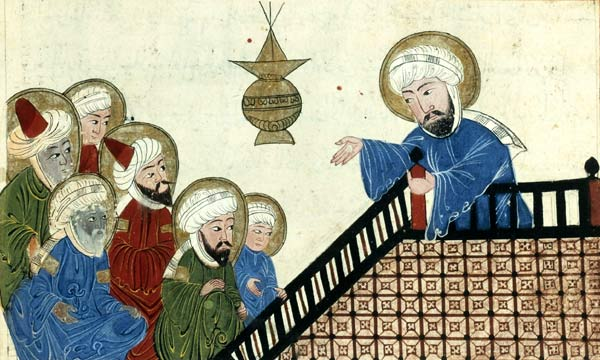
The petition opposed a depiction of Muhammad prohibiting Nasīʾ.

The petition opposed a reproduction of a 17th-century Ottoman copy of a 14th-century Ilkhanate manuscript image (MS Arabe 1489) depicting Muhammad as he prohibited Nasīʾ. Jeremy Henzell-Thomas of The American Muslim deplored the petition as one of "these mechanical knee-jerk reactions [which] are gifts to those who seek every opportunity to decry Islam and ridicule Muslims and can only exacerbate a situation in which Muslims and the Western media seem to be locked in an ever-descending spiral of ignorance and mutual loathing."

Wikipedia considered but rejected a compromise that would allow visitors to choose whether to view the page with images. The Wikipedia community has not acted upon the petition. The site's answers to frequently asked questions about these images state that Wikipedia does not censor itself for the benefit of any one group.

=== Charlie Hebdo ===
3 November 2011 cover of Charlie Hebdo, renamed Charia Hebdo (Sharia Hebdo). The word balloon reads "100 lashes if you don't die of laughter!"

Cover of 14 January 2015 in the same style as the 3 November 2011 cover, with the phrase Je Suis Charlie and the title "All is forgiven."

On 2 November 2010, the office of the French satirical weekly newspaper Charlie Hebdo at Paris was attacked with a firebomb and its website hacked, after it had announced plans to publish a special edition with Muhammad as its “chief editor”, and the title page with a cartoon of Muhammad had been pre-issued on social media.

In September 2012, the newspaper published a series of satirical cartoons of Muhammad, some of which feature nude caricatures of him. In January 2013, Charlie Hebdo announced that they would make a comic book on the life of Muhammad. In March 2013, Al-Qaeda's branch in Yemen, commonly known as Al-Qaeda in the Arabian Peninsula (AQAP), released a hit list in an edition of their English-language magazine Inspire. The list included Stéphane Charbonnier, Lars Vilks, three Jyllands-Posten employees involved in the Muhammad cartoon controversy, Molly Norris from the Everybody Draw Mohammed Day and others whom AQAP accused of insulting Islam.

On 7 January 2015, the office was attacked again with 12 shot dead, including Stéphane Charbonnier, and 11 injured. A May 3, 2015, event held in Garland, Texas, held by American activists Pamela Geller and Robert Spencer, was the scene of a shooting by two individuals who were later themselves shot and killed outside the event. Police officers assisting in security at the event returned fire and killed the two gunmen. The event offered a $10,000 prize and was said to be in response to the January 2015 attacks on Charlie Hebdo. One of the gunmen was identified as a former terror suspect, known to the Federal Bureau of Investigation.

On 16 October 2020, middle-school teacher Samuel Paty was killed and beheaded after showing Charlie Hebdo cartoons depicting Muhammad during a class discussion on freedom of speech.

In March 2021 a teacher at Batley Grammar School in England was suspended, and the headmaster issued an apology, after the teacher showed one or more of the Charlie Hebdo cartoons to pupils during a lesson. The incident sparked protests outside the school, demanding the resignation or sacking of the teacher involved. Commenting on the situation, the UK government's Communities Secretary, Robert Jenrick, said teachers should be able to "appropriately show images of the prophet" in class and the protests are "deeply unsettling" due to the UK being a "free society". He added teachers should "not be threatened" by religious extremists.

=== Other incidents ===
The Metropolitan Museum of Art in January 2010 confirmed to the New York Post that it had quietly removed all historic paintings which contained depictions of Muhammad from public exhibition. The Museum quoted objections on the part of conservative Muslims which were "under review". The museum's action was criticized as excessive political correctness, as were other decisions taken close to the same time, including the renaming of the "Primitive Art Galleries" to the "Arts of Africa, Oceania and the Americas" and the projected "Islamic Galleries" to "Arab Lands, Turkey, Iran, Central Asia and Later South Asia".

In December 2022, Hamline University in Saint Paul, Minnesota did not renew the contract of an adjunct professor over an October 2022 global art history class showing Medieval-era paintings of Muhammad, despite her providing a content warning and allowing students to opt-out of the viewing. In response to criticism from the university's Muslim Students Association chapter, Hamline's Vice President for Inclusive Excellence criticized the incident as Islamophobic. In the next few days, while the Dean of Students classified the professor's teaching as "an act of intolerance", President Fayneese Miller cautioned all Hamline employees that "respect for the observant Muslim students should have superseded academic freedom." The Foundation for Individual Rights and Expression, PEN America, Muslim Public Affairs Council, and Council on American–Islamic Relations all issued statements supporting the professor's academic freedom. In addition, the case prompted a formal investigation by the American Association of University Professors. In January 2023, the professor sued for religious discrimination and defamation, prompting Hamline University officials to retract their accusations of Islamophobia.

== See also ==
- Qadam-e-Rasul, "Footprint of the Messenger"
- The Satanic Verses by Salman Rushdie
- 2006 Idomeneo controversy
- Jesus and Mo

General:

- Censorship in Islamic societies
- Shi'ite iconography
- Criticism of Muhammad
