= List of ambassadors of Switzerland to the United States =

List of Swiss diplomats

Ambassador of Switzerland to the United States
- Incumbent; Ralf Heckner since 20 September 2024
- Style: His Excellency
- Residence: The Swiss Residence
- Website: The Swiss Ambassador

The Ambassador of Switzerland to the United States of America (French: Ambassadeur de Suisse auprès des États-Unis d'Amérique, German: Botschafter der Schweiz in die Vereinigten Staaten von Amerika, Italian: Ambasciatore della Svizzera agli Stati Uniti d'America, Romansh: Ambasciatore da Svizra a las Stadis Unids da l’America) is the representative of the government of Switzerland in United States.

== History ==
The very first Ambassador to the United States from Switzerland was Emil Frey, who served from 1882 to 1888.

== Role ==
The Swiss Ambassador to the United States is Head of the Embassy of Switzerland to the United States in Washington, D.C. Their duty is to promote exchange in science, technology, culture, and economic and political relations between Switzerland and the United States.

Since 1979, the Swiss Ambassador to the United States has also represented U.S. interests in Iran.

From 1961 to 2015 the Swiss Ambassador represented United States interests in Cuba and from 1991 to 2015 represented Cuban interests in the United States.

The Embassy of Switzerland and the Swiss Consulates General offer services and protection for Swiss people living in the United States.

== List of Swiss Ambassadors ==
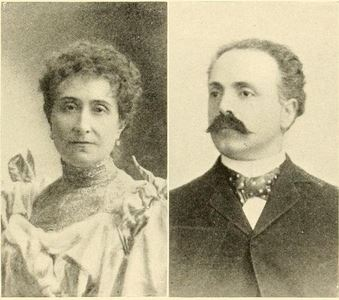
Mrs J.B. Pioda and Mr. Giovan B. Pioda, Swiss Ambassador

=== From 1882 to 1958 as the Swiss Minister ===
- Emil Frey (1882–1888) Swiss Minister
- Alfred de Claparède (1888–1893)
- Giovanni Battista Pioda II (1894–1902)
- Fernand du Martheray (1902–1904)
- Leo Vogel (1904–1909)
- Paul Ritter (1909–1917)
- Hans A. Sulzer (1917–1919)
- Marc Peter (1919–1939)
- Carl Bruggmann (1939–1954)
- Henry de Torrenté (1955–1958)

=== Since 1958 as the Ambassador ===
- Henry de Torrenté (1958–1960)
- August R. Lindt (1960–1963)
- Alfred Zehnder (1963–1966)
- Felix Schnyder (1966–1975)
- Raymond Probst (1976–1980)
- Anton Robert Hegner (1980–1984)
- Klaus Jacobi (1984–1989)
- Edouard Brunner (1989–1993)
- Carlo Jagmetti (1993–1997)
- Alfred Defago (1997–2001)
- Christian Blickenstorfer (2001–2006)
- Urs Ziswiler (2006–2010)
- Manuel Sager (2010–2014)
- Martin Dahinden (2014–2019)
- Jacques Pitteloud (2019–2024)
- Ralf Heckner (2024–present)

== See also ==
- Switzerland–United States relations
- United States Ambassador to Switzerland and Liechtenstein
