= Trade policy of Switzerland =

Exports of Switzerland by product category (2019) Chemical products Transportation Machines Mineral products Plastics and rubbers Metals Foodstuffs Precious metals Textiles Instruments Animal products Vegetable products Paper goods Footwear and headwear Miscellaneous Stone and glass Wood products Animal and vegetable bi-products Animal hides Arts and antiques Weapons

The trade policy of Switzerland refers to Switzerland's approach to importing and exporting with other countries.

== Background ==
After being recognized as an independent state in 1648 by the Peace of Westphalia, Switzerland maintained a modern market economy as craftsmen gained a reputation across Europe for quality and skill. After the Napoleonic Wars (1803-1815), Switzerland experienced a period of large economic growth. There was improvement in the agriculture sector and tourism, especially from England, began to rise. The industrial sector of Switzerland was the sector that increased the most during this time. Due to England enduring a blockade in the textile industry, Switzerland was pushed to modernize textile production and start mechanical spinning. A large scale cotton plant was created in 1802 in Zürich, leading to a boom in the fabric manufacturing industry. With the increase in textile production and the modernization of spinning techniques, Switzerland soon began exporting surplus textiles. With the rise in the textile industry, there was an increased need in inexpensive labor and raw materials, which Switzerland was lacking and thus began importing from other countries. In 1848, after uniting the state under the federal constitution, Switzerland was politically stable and free from war, which could not be said for other European countries at this time. Using this to their advantage, Switzerland began focusing solely on improving its industrial, agricultural, and financial sectors.

== Trade agreements ==
Switzerland, officially the Swiss Confederation, has been a part of the European Free Trade Association since May 1960. Within this association, Switzerland and the countries with which it has an agreement are able to remove customs duties and generally protect intellectual property rights. The European Free Trade Association also regulates their trade in industrial, fish and processed agricultural products. This does not cover agricultural trade due to each member country having differing policies. Rather, agricultural trade is discussed in separate bilateral agreements. Other free trade agreements, like with Japan and China, expand on the regulations of EFTA, regarding trade in services, investment, and public procurement. The Agreement on Free Trade and Economic Partnership with Japan was completed in February 2009, strengthening the already strong relationship between Japan and Switzerland. A free trade agreement between China and Switzerland was signed in 2013, leading to a decrease in tariffs and a decrease in nontariff barriers as well. A free trade agreement in services is important as many Chinese service providers show interest in Switzerland as a business hub and many Switzerland service providers operate in China. Overall, Switzerland has thirty free trade agreements with forty countries. Negotiations are currently being held with Indonesia, India, and with Mercosur countries.

The European Union is the main trading partner of Switzerland, with around fifty-two percent of exports going into the EU. This trade relationship began when the EU and Switzerland had created the Free Trade Agreement of 1972. This gave each country the ability to trade industrial products free of a customs duty. The FTA also ensured that no quotas could be set on the number of goods traded. Later in 1999, the EU and Switzerland formed a package of seven agreements, called the Bilateral I agreements. Within these agreements are included the free movement of people, nontariff trade barriers for health, safety and environmental protection, public procurement, agriculture, and air and land transport. Another set of agreements, called Bilateral II, were implemented in 2004. These new agreements added new economic interests, such as tourism, the food industry, and financial centers. It also improved political affairs between the EU and Switzerland, including world affairs, asylum, and internal security. While Switzerland is largely involved in the international economy for industrial goods, the agricultural sector is protected. Due to Switzerland being strict with their food regulations, many trading countries have to adapt their products to fit in with European guidelines.

Switzerland has been a member of the World Trade Organization since July 1995. Under the WTO, Switzerland is committed to lowering customs tariffs and to keep open services markets. WTO ensures all member countries are following requirements set upon them and that the requirements are being implemented correctly. With their membership, Switzerland is able to calm any trade disputes with other countries through WTO.

Switzerland uses the Harmonized System to guide their trade policies, which was first implemented in 1988. Every product that is intended to be imported or exported requires an eight-digit tariff heading, given by the Harmonized System.

According to the World Trade Organisation (WTO), Switzerland is one of the biggest export partners of Armenia. In 2020 the largest exports to Switzerland in values are $293.86M worth of Ores slag and $133.49M worth of pearls, precious stones, metals, coins.

== U.S. relations ==
The United States of America is the second largest export market for Switzerland. The U.S. and Switzerland established diplomatic relations after Switzerland became an unified state in 1853. One agreement that the U.S. and Switzerland have is the U.S.- Swiss Joint Economic Commission, which covers various topics such as anti-money laundering efforts, counterterrorism, intellectual property rights, and regulatory cooperation. There is also an agreement in which both countries assess areas in which the other government could improve trade flows and investments. The U.S. and Switzerland signed three new agreements in 2006, which strengthened the economic cooperation between the two countries. The three new agreements are the Enhanced Political Cooperation Framework, the Trade and Investment Cooperation Forum, and the Operative Working Arrangement on Law Enforcement Cooperation on Counterterrorism. In 2008, the U.S. and Switzerland signed a Joint Declaration on e-commerce, showing their mutual commitment of encouraging e-commerce.

=== Proposed Free Trade Agreement ===
Since the early 2000s, Switzerland and the United States have had intermittent discussions about pursuing a free trade agreement.

== Export policies ==
Switzerland is the 18th largest export economy in the world, with exports at a total of $285 billion in 2017. The top countries that Switzerland export to are Germany, the United States, China, India, and Hong Kong. Exports in the past five years have increased at a rate of 0.4% per year. Exported items include precious metals such as gold, chemical products such as packaged medicines and human blood, and plastics. The State Secretariat for Economic Affairs can refuse to export any product if there is reason to assume that said products could be intended for the development, production, or use of biological or chemical weapons or could within its nature, endanger regional or global security.

Switzerland exported $310.5 billion worth of goods in 2018. 45.9% of exports were to other European nations while 35.1% were exported to Asian countries and 14.9% exported to North America. The top ten exports (2018) include:

1. Gems and precious metals (26.2% of exports)
2. Pharmaceuticals (24.2% of exports)
3. Machinery-computers (8%)
4. Clocks, watches- including parts (7%)
5. Organic chemicals (6.7%)
6. Various medical apparatus (5.6%)
7. Electrical machinery and equipment (4.1%)
8. Plastics and plastic articles (1.8%)
9. Perfumes and cosmetics (1.2%)
10. Articles of iron or steel (1%)

Exports increased 8.2 percent from September 2019 due to higher sales in chemical and pharmaceutical products, jewelry, and metals. Exports increased to Japan, the United States, the United Kingdom, Germany, Italy, France, Belgium, the Netherlands, Austria, the Middle East, and Singapore.

In July 2023, the Swiss Franc reached its highest evaluation since 2015 compared to the USD and other major currencies. To keep inflation low in Switzerland in the post-COVID-19 period, the Swiss National Bank pursued a policy of keeping the Swiss currency hard due to the fact that many Swiss consumer goods are imported from Europe, the US and Asia. Because of the Swiss Franc's high evaluation, however, exports were under pressure. While export markets for luxury goods such as watches and jewelry were less affected and indeed showed a significant gain (up 14%) in the first half of 2023 due to increased demand in the U.S. and China, total exports of other goods in the second quarter of 2023 were stagnating (-2.8% in relation to last quarter) and were even projected to fall further during the second half of 2023; the growth outlook for the Swiss economy as well appeared sluggish. A clear exception was seen in the exports of Swiss war materials, they increased by 6% in March 2023, but they only account for 0.25% of total Swiss exports. On 18 September 2023, SNB unexpectedly left the deposit rate unchanged at 1.75% and as a result, the Swiss franc depreciated in relation to the USD, which is crucial for the Swiss export industry. In summer 2023 the value of the Swiss franc was highly priced due to the low inflation in Switzerland, and an increasing demand for safe haven currencies. Foreign exchange rates had unreasonably put pressure on Swiss-based companies that rely on international business.

== Import policies ==
Switzerland is the 17th largest import economy in the world, with imports at a total of $273 billion in 2017. The top countries that Switzerland import from are Germany, the United States, Italy, the United Kingdom, and France. Imports in the past five years have decreased by 2% each year. When importing biotech feed or animal feed products, the products must go through a lengthy approval process, along with getting proper labels for every biotechnical ingredient and ingredients that result from a biotechnical product. Animal products imported into Switzerland must have special health certificates stamped by certain authorities in the country of origin. As of 2009, Switzerland has implemented a common space with the EU, allowing animal or animal products to flow through Switzerland's market after inspection at EU border posts. Any products that are imported are required to be declared within a certain time period, dependent on the type of transportation. If imported by road, the item must be declared within 24 hours; 48 hours if by river; 7 days if by railway; and 7 days if by air travel.

Switzerland imported $279.2 billion worth of goods in 2018. 63.1% of those imports come from other European nations, with 20.7% from Asian countries, and 8.8% from North America. The top ten imports (2018) include:

1. Gems and precious metals (31% of imports)
2. Pharmaceuticals (10.7% of imports)
3. Machinery- computers (7.2%)
4. Vehicles (5.6%)
5. Electrical machinery and equipment (5.3%)
6. Organic chemicals (4.6%)
7. Mineral fuels including oil (3.5%)
8. Various medical apparatus (3%)
9. Plastic and plastic articles (2.5%)
10. Furniture, bedding, lighting, signs, pre-fabricated buildings (1.7%)

Imports dropped 1.4 percent from September 2019 due to decreased purchases of chemical and pharmaceutical products, jewelry, metal, and energy products. Imports decreased from Spain, the Netherlands, Belgium, the United Kingdom, China, and Japan.
