= Alfred Zehnder =

Swiss diplomat (1900–1983)

His Excellency Alfred Zehnder
- Memorial for the Swiss diplomat Adolf L. alias Alfred Zehnder at the Bismarck-Museum Friedrichsruh in Friedrichsruh.

Ambassador of Switzerland to the United States
- In office 13 February 1963 – 15 January 1966
- Preceded by: August R. Lindt
- Succeeded by: Felix Schnyder

Personal details
- Born: 11 April 1900 Karavayevka near Moscow, Russian Empire (now Russia)
- Died: 14 January 1983 (aged 82) Horgen, Switzerland
- Spouses: Olga Eymann (m. 1923; died 1956); Lucie Elisabeth Opprecht (m. 1961)
- Children: 1
- Occupation: Economist, diplomat

Alfred Zehnder (11 April 1900 – 14 January 1983) was a Swiss economist and diplomat who most notably served as Ambassador of Switzerland to the United States from 1963 to 1966.

== Early life and education ==
Zehnder was born 11 April 1900 in Karavayevka near Moscow, Russian Empire, to Jakob Emil Zehnder, a businessman and industrialist, and Helene Ida Jenny Zehnder (née Friedrich), into an affluent Protestant family.

He had an older sister and two younger brothers. His Swiss-born father was an expatriate who worked for the Russian subsidiary of J. R. Geigy in Karavayevka near Moscow.

He completed his Certificate of Maturity in 1918 in Russian language at the private Reformed School of Moscow. In the same year her fled the country due to Russian Civil War, to Zurich, where he completed the Swiss maturity exam in German. He ultimately completed a PhD in Economics at the University of Zurich.

== Personal life ==
In 1923, Zehnder married firstly to Russian-born Olga Margareta Eymann (1898–1956), who was born in Saint Petersburg to Swiss parents. She died in 1956. They had one daughter;

- Hélène Olga Silvia Zehnder, married to Marius Cartier, a professor and lecturer at the University of Berne, three children.

In 1961, he married secondly to Lucie Elisabeth Opprecht (1928–2021), without issue. Zehnder died on 14 January 1983 in Horgen on Lake Zurich aged 82.

== See also ==
- List of ambassadors of Switzerland to the United States
- Switzerland–United States relations
- Russia–Switzerland relations
- Swiss emigration to Russia
- Foreign relations of Switzerland
