= Raymond Probst =

His Excellency Raymond Probst
- Probst in 1984

State Secretary for the EAER
- In office 1980–1984

Swiss Ambassador to the United States
- In office 1976 – 1980
- Preceded by: Felix Schnyder
- Succeeded by: Anton Robert Hegner

Personal details
- Born: Raymond Probst; 6 March 1919 Geneva, Switzerland
- Died: 9 May 2001 (aged 82) Biel, Switzerland
- Spouse: Annemarie Rey
- Children: 2
- Occupation: Businessman; Diplomat

Raymond Probst (6 March 1919 – 9 May 2001) was a Swiss jurist and diplomat who most notably served as State Secretary for the EAER from 1980 to 1984. He previously served as Ambassador of Switzerland to the United States from 1976 to 1980.
