= Swiss American Historical Society =

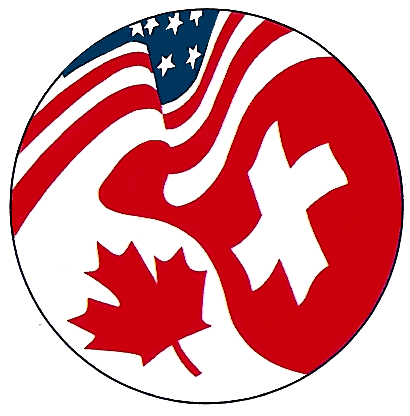

The Swiss American Historical Society (SAHS) is a historical society founded in Chicago in 1927. According to the Society's website, it was established "to promote the study of the Swiss in America, of Swiss–American relations, of Swiss immigration to the United States, and of American interest in Swiss history and culture." Currently, the society unites not only people with these interests, but also those who seek to do genealogical research.

The society publishes the Swiss American Historical Society Review three times a year and meets annually, the location rotating between Philadelphia, Washington, D.C., and New York.

With members primarily in the United States, Canada, and Switzerland, the SAHS fosters contact between both sides of the Atlantic and serves as a link between Swiss Americans, Swiss, and Americans in an effort to promote cultural awareness and mutual understanding.

== History ==
The late nineteenth and early twentieth centuries saw the establishment of a number of historical societies in the United States, representing various immigrant groups. Amidst this proliferation of immigrant historical societies, Swiss Americans and those interested in them and their history had by the 1920s become disillusioned at "the fact that every outstanding person of Swiss origin was claimed by some other nation.” Among these were Ernest A. Kübler, Bruno Bachmann, and August Rüedy, who on July 4, 1927, founded the Swiss American Historical Society in Chicago. By December the organization had been incorporated into the State of Illinois.

The Society immediately set forth to prepare and publish several works increasing awareness of the Swiss in the United States. However, due to several factors, including the Great Depression throughout the 1930s, the Society began to decline in membership and activity. By 1937, only 48 due-paying members remained. Anti-German sentiment in the forties did little to help the Society's standing. The Society continued mostly dormant throughout the forties and fifties.

=== Since 1963 ===
Beginning in 1963, with the involvement of Dr. Lukas F. Burckhardt, SAHS member and cultural counselor at the Embassy of Switzerland in Washington, Alfred Zehnder, Ambassador of Switzerland to the United States, and Heinz K. Meier, the Society began to be revitalized. By 1965, plans had been established to put out several newsletters per year, to present scholarly papers at their one business meeting per year, and to resume publishing work such as they had started at the Society's beginning.

In 1979 the organization published an introductory guide to Swiss genealogy to facilitate research for those interested in Swiss family history.

After the 1970s, the Society's newsletter became increasingly more scholarly, and in 1990 became the Swiss American Historical Society Review, seen by the Society as a voice-giving instrument for Swiss Americans. The Review is currently published three times a year, in February, June, and November. The journal includes book reviews, articles of interest to Swiss Americans, and summaries of Society proceedings.

In addition to the Review, the Society has published thirty books; two more are in preparation.

The Society meets annually, with meetings rotating between Philadelphia, Washington, D.C., and New York. Presentations at meetings explore a variety of topics related to the history of Swiss-American immigrants.

== Selected book publications ==
Prominent Americans of Swiss Origins, 1932.

The Swiss in the United States, 1940.

Rudolf Aschmann, Memoirs of a Swiss Officer in the American Civil War, 1972.

Paul A. Nielson, Swiss Genealogical Research: An Introductory Guide, 1979.

Emil Frey, An American Apprenticeship: The Letters of Emil Frey, 1860–1865, 1986.

David Sutton, One's Hearth Is Like Gold: A History of Helvetia, West Virginia, 1990.

Laura R. Villiger, Mari Sandoz: A Study in Post-Colonial Discourse, 1994.

Konrad Basler, The Dorkilon Emigrants: Swiss Settlers and Cultural Founders in the United States – A Personal Report, 1996.

Mennonites in Transition: From Switzerland to America, 1997.

Donald Tritt, ed., Swiss Festivals, 1999.

Leo Schelbert, ed., Switzerland Under Siege, 1939–1945: A Neutral Nation's Struggle for Survival, 2001.

Lewis B. Rohrbach, Genealogical Research in Switzerland: An Introductory Guide, 2005.

Leo Lesquereux, Letters from America, 1853, 2006.

Jakob Otto Wyss (1846–1927): Postmaster in Klau – Letters from California, 2007.

Brigitte and Eugen Bachmann-Geiser, Amish: The Way of Life of the Amish in Berne, Indiana, 2009.

Susann Bosshard-Kälin, Westward: Encounters with Swiss American Women, 2010.

Annemarie Regez, Off to the Wild Wild West: Gummel, Franz and Konrad Make Their Fortune with the Chuchichäschtli, 2024.

== Selected journal articles ==
Swiss American – Colonial – 1860

Pfister, Hans Ulrich (2003) "Swiss Migration to America in the 1730s: A Representative Family : the Pfister family of Hori, Canton Zurich and the Feaster family in America," Swiss American Historical Society Review: Vol. 39 : No. 1, Article 2.

Rohrbach, Lewis B. CG (2003) "The 1710 Von Graffenried Settlement Of New Bern, North Carolina," Swiss American Historical Society Review: Vol. 39 : No. 2, Article 3.

Page, H. Dwight (2010) "The Tercentenary of New Bern," Swiss American Historical Society Review: Vol. 46 : No. 2, Article 5.

Ferraro, Nicholas (2014) "The Extraordinary Life of John Sutter," Swiss American Historical Society Review: Vol. 50 : No. 1, Article 4.

Robinson, Marsha R. (2016) "The Love Story Behind the 1846 Swiss Colony in St. Clara, West Virginia," Swiss American Historical Society Review: Vol. 52 : No. 1, Article 4.

Swiss American – 1860-1920

Bruhin, Herbert (2002) "Theology His Profession, Botany His Passion: Thomas A. Bruhin, 1835-1895," Swiss American Historical Society Review: Vol. 38 : No. 2, Article 3.

Winkler, Albert (2011) "Henry Wirz And Andersonville: The Career Of The most Controversial Swiss American," Swiss American Historical Society Review: Vol. 47 : No. 2, Article 2.

Vogelsanger, David (2015) "Swiss in the American Civil War A Forgotten Chapter of our Military History," Swiss American Historical Society Review: Vol. 51 : No. 3, Article 5.

Winkler, Albert (2014) "Henry Wirz and the Tragedy of Andersonville: A Question of Responsibility," Swiss American Historical Society Review: Vol. 50 : No. 3, Article 2.

Siber, Elizabeth M. (2004) "Experience and Enlightenment: Character Portrait in Letters of Johann Caspar Lohbauer," Swiss American Historical Society Review: Vol. 40 : No. 1, Article 3. Armknecht, Megan (2016) "How Louisa May Alcott's 1870 Visit to Switzerland Helped Her Become a "Literary Lion"," Swiss American Historical Society Review: Vol. 52 : No. 2, Article 4.

Quinn, Tony (2011) "The Ticino Swiss Immigration To California," Swiss American Historical Society Review: Vol. 47 : No. 1, Article 3.

Winkler, Albert (2018) "The Germans and Swiss at the Battle of the Little Bighorn 1876," Swiss American Historical Society Review: Vol. 54 : No. 3, Article 2.

Aregger, Manfred (2007) "From Escholzmatt, Canton Lucerne, to Chicago, Illinois: The Emigration of the Family Marbacher," Swiss American Historical Society Review: Vol. 43 : No. 2, Article 4.

Nauer, Heinz (2016) "Einsiedeln on the Ohio Overseas Migrations of Einsiedeln People to the United States in the 19th and Early 20th Centuries," Swiss American Historical Society Review: Vol. 52 : No. 3, Article 4.

Vogelsanger, David (2017) "A Swiss Artist, an Iconic American General and an Ambitious Federal Councilor," Swiss American Historical Society Review: Vol. 53 : No. 3, Article 2.

Schmid, Frederick (2019) "Katharina Morgan-Schmid From Schuepfheim: El Paso, Texas, 1918 Presumed Spy Affai r," Swiss American Historical Society Review: Vol. 55 : No. 1, Article 3.

Brightenburg, Cindy (2019) "Swiss-American Missionaries for the Church of Jesus Christ of Latter-day Saints in the Nineteenth Century," Swiss American Historical Society Review: Vol. 55 : No. 2, Article 2

Swiss American – 1920 – Present

Freitag, Duane (2010) "From Dream to Reality: The Swiss Center of North America," Swiss American Historical Society Review: Vol. 46 : No. 2, Article 4.

Swiss History – long time ago to 1650

Marabello, Thomas Quinn (2021) "The 500th Anniversary of the Swiss Reformation: How Zwingli changed and continues to impact Switzerland today," Swiss American Historical Society Review, Vol. 57: No. 1, Available at: https://scholarsarchive.byu.edu/sahs_review/vol57/iss1/3

Winkler, Albert (2014) "The Federal Charter of 1291 and the Founding of the Swiss State," Swiss American Historical Society Review: Vol. 50 : No. 1, Article 3.

Winkler, Albert (2008) "The Battle of Morgarten in 1315: An Essential Incident in the Founding of the Swiss State," Swiss American Historical Society Review: Vol. 44 : No. 3, Article 3.

Winkler, Albert (2007) "The Approach of the Black Death in Switzerland and the Persecution of Jews, 1348-1349," Swiss American Historical Society Review: Vol. 43 : No. 3, Article 2.

Winkler, Albert (2010) "The Battle of Murten: The Invasion of Charles the Bold and the Survival of the Swiss States," Swiss American Historical Society Review: Vol. 46 : No. 1, Article 3.

Hostettler, Paul (2014) "The Use of the Terms Piemontese, Waldenses, and Exiles in the Bernese Council Manuals of the 17th Century," Swiss American Historical Society Review: Vol. 50 : No. 2, Article 2

Lindberg, James T. (2018) "Mapping the State: Cartographic Representations of Switzerland, 1530-1865," Swiss American Historical Society Review: Vol. 54 : No. 2, Article 2.

Swiss History – 1650 to the present

Leuenberger, Hans (2020) "Niklaus Leuenberger: Predating Gandhi In 1653?," Swiss American Historical Society Review: Vol. 56 : No. 1, Article 6.

Lerner, Marc H. (2002) "The Battles over Swiss Liberty," Swiss American Historical Society Review: Vol. 38 : No. 3, Article 3.

Halbrook, Stephen P. (2012) "The Swiss Confederation In the Eyes of America's Founders," Swiss American Historical Society Review: Vol. 48 : No. 3, Article 4.

Wages, Brian (2011) "Considering Swiss Neutrality In World War One: Ideas, Successes, And Failures," Swiss American Historical Society Review: Vol. 47 : No. 2, Article 3.

Herman, William E. (2012) "The Ideas of Jean Piaget: Using Theory to Better Understand Theory and Improve Learning," Swiss American Historical Society Review: Vol. 48 : No. 3, Article 3.

Kessler, Mario (2012) "Ernst Engelberg (1909-2010): Historian And Anti-Nazi Activist," Swiss American Historical Society Review: Vol. 48 : No. 1, Article 3.

Sherwood, Robert (2020) "Where are the Sons of Tell? A Brief History of the Formative Years of Swiss Biathlon, 1957-1964," Swiss American Historical Society Review: Vol. 56 : No. 3, Article 3.

Fair-Schulz, Laura L. M. and Herman, William E. (2017) "Privilege as Blind Spot: Carl Jung, The Red Book, and the"Collective Unconscious"," Swiss American Historical Society Review: Vol. 53 : No. 1, Article 4.

Ahmad, C. Naseer (2017) "The Gotthard Base Tunnel in a Historical Perspective," Swiss American Historical Society Review: Vol. 53 : No. 2, Article 3.

Winiger, Alex (2020) "Militant Switzerland vs. Switzerland, Island Of Peace," Swiss American Historical Society Review: Vol. 56 : No. 1, Article 5.

Swiss in the World

Marabello, Thomas Quinn (2023) "The Centennial of the Treaty of Lausanne: Turkey, Switzerland, the Great Powers and a Soviet Diplomat’s Assassination," Swiss American Historical Society Review: Vol. 59: No. 3, Article 4. Available at: https://scholarsarchive.byu.edu/sahs_review/vol59/iss3/4.

Champion, Brian (2011) "Heidi And Seek: Cases Of Espionage And Covert Operations In Switzerland, 1795-1995," Swiss American Historical Society Review: Vol. 47 : No. 2, Article 4.

Gander-Wolf, Heidi (2014) "Once a Swiss Winegrower Colony Named CHABAG in Russia Now a Modern Winegrowing Center Called SHABO in the Ukraine," Swiss American Historical Society Review: Vol. 50 : No. 2, Article 4.

Means, Robert S. (2016) "Neutral Ground: Switzerland and Some British Poets of the Great War," Swiss American Historical Society Review: Vol. 52 : No. 2, Article 3.

Holenstein, Elmar (2015) "Asian Values-Swiss Values?," Swiss American Historical Society Review: Vol. 51 : No. 3, Article 2.

Herman, Bryan K. and Fair-Schulz, Axel (2017) "A Chasm Between Two Vanguards: Near Encounters of Russian Emigre Marxists and Dadaism in Switzerland," Swiss American Historical Society Review: Vol. 53 : No. 1, Article 3.

Page, Dwight (2017) "Zurich and the Birth of French Surrealism," Swiss American Historical Society Review: Vol. 53 : No. 1, Article 2.

Champion, Brian (2019) ""Why Does it Always Have to be Switzerland?"Daniel Silva's Treatment of Swiss Society and Culture in Selected Mossad Spy Novels," Swiss American Historical Society Review: Vol. 55 : No. 2, Article 4.

Peter-Kubli, Susanne (2020) "Two Early Nineteenth Century Overseas Emigrants From Näfels, Kanton Glarus, Switzerland: Walter Marianus Hauser and the Colony at Red River, Canada," Swiss American Historical Society Review: Vol. 56 : No. 2, Article 2.

== See also ==
- Swiss American
