= Ralf Heckner =

His Excellency Ralf Heckner

Ambassador of Switzerland to the United States
- Incumbent
- Assumed office 20 September 2024
- President: Viola Amherd
- Preceded by: Jacques Pitteloud

Personal details
- Born: Ralf Heckner; 1967 (age 58–59) Davos, Switzerland
- Spouse: Ilaria Macconi
- Children: 2
- Education: University of Fribourg PhD
- Occupation: Diplomat
- Website: FDFA website

Ralf Heckner (German pronunciation: [ʁalf ˈhɛknɐ]; born 1967) is a Swiss diplomat who currently serves as Ambassador of Switzerland to the United States since 2024. He previously served as Ambassador to India and Bhutan.

== Early life and education ==
Heckner was born 1967 in Davos, Switzerland, to German-born Gert Heckner, a professor for French and Latin, and Margrit Heckner, into a Catholic family. During his youth he served as an altar server.

His father is originally from Cologne, Germany and came to Switzerland in the 1950s, obtaining a Doctorate from the University of Fribourg. Heckner attended the local schools and subsequently studied History at the University of Fribourg and the University of Rome and obtained a PhD.
