= PROFOR =

Program on Forests
- Abbreviation: PROFOR
- Formation: 1997
- Affiliations: World Bank
- Website: http://www.profor.info

The Program on Forests (PROFOR) was a multi-donor trust fund for forests and poverty reduction administered by the World Bank. It began at the United Nations Development Programme in 1997 and moved to the World Bank in 2002. It closed in June 2020, replaced by a new trust fund with a landscape focus, PROGREEN.

PROFOR supported the creation of knowledge about livelihoods (how forests helped people support themselves), finance (how money was made available and spent for activities in forests), governance (how law, administration, and culture affected forest use), and cross-sectoral interactions (how sectors like mining, agriculture, and transportation affected forests). During its time at the World Bank, PROFOR received funding from the governments of the United Kingdom through the Department for International Development, Switzerland through the Swiss Agency for Development and Cooperation, the European Union (EU), Germany through the Deutsche Gesellschaft für Internationale Zusammenarbeit, Finland through the Department for International Development Cooperation, Japan through the International Forestry Cooperation Office, Italy through the Ministry of Foreign Affairs, and the Netherlands through the Ministry of Agriculture, Nature and Food Quality. In total, PROFOR received approximately $52 million, with which it supported 273 distinct projects.

PROFOR released several studies on forests and livelihoods, including:

- Securing Forest Tenure Rights for Rural Development: Lessons from Six Countries in Latin America
- Harnessing the Potential of Private Sector Engagement in Productive Forests for Green Growth

The program also funded a project in Jamaica “assessing the economic valuation of coastal protection services provided by mangroves.”
