= Dahinden =

Dahinden is a surname. Notable people with the surname include:

- Justus Dahinden (1925–2020), Swiss architect
- Martin Dahinden (born 1955), Swiss diplomat
- René Dahinden (1930–2001), Canadian Bigfoot researcher
- Roland Dahinden (born 1962), Swiss trombonist and composer
