= Embassy of Switzerland, Washington, D.C. =

Diplomatic mission of the Swiss Confederation to the United States

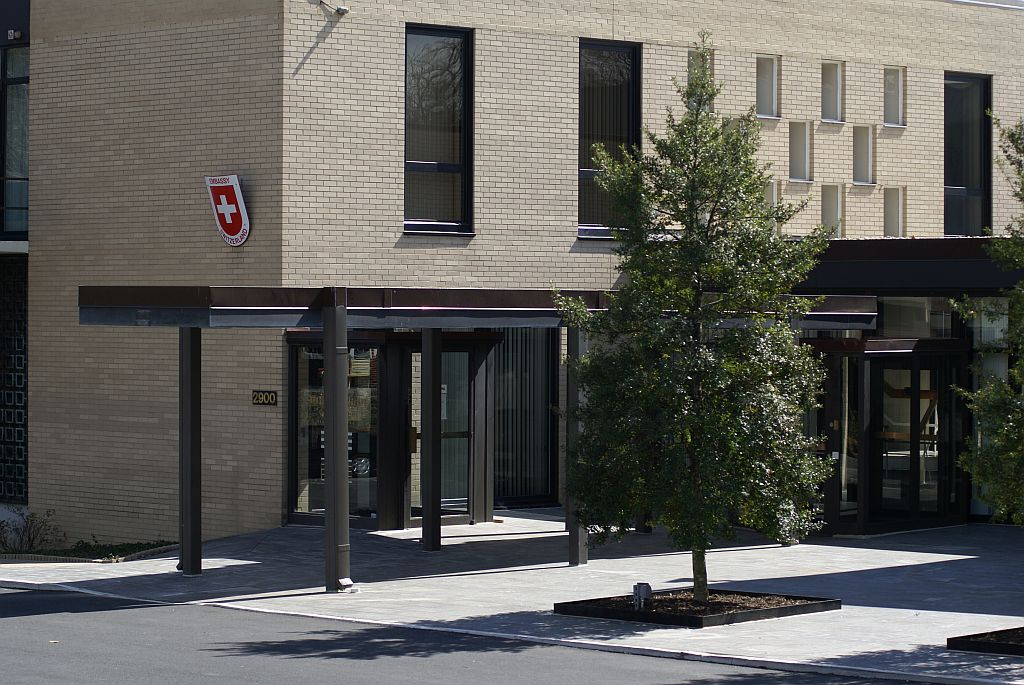
- Location: Washington, D.C.
- Address: 2900 Cathedral Avenue, N.W.
- Coordinates: 38°55′42″N 77°3′28″W
- Ambassador: Ralf Heckner
- Website: Embassy of Switzerland in the United States of America

The Embassy of Switzerland in Washington, D.C. (German: Schweizerische Botschaft in den Vereinigten Staaten, French: Ambassade de Suisse aux Etats-Unis d’Amérique, Italian: Ambasciata di Svizzera negli Stati Uniti d’America) is the diplomatic mission of the Swiss Confederation to the United States. It is located at 2900 Cathedral Avenue, Northwest, Washington, D.C., in the Woodley Park neighborhood.

The area of the premises of the embassy and ambassador's residence were originally mostly unoccupied with the exception of Dumbarton House and Woodley Mansion. After various ownership transfers between American officials, the Swiss government purchased the land in 1941 for their legation. This was upgraded to an embassy in 1953. A new chancery was built in 1959, while the former chancery, known as Single Oak, become the residence of the ambassador before it was demolished and replaced in 2004 with a new, modernist house meant to conjure the grey-and-white scenery of the Alps. The former ambassador Jacques Pitteloud started an ongoing project to revitalize the grounds and restore native plants and wildlife in 2020.

The embassy also operates Consulates-General in Atlanta, Chicago, New York City and San Francisco and maintains a consulate in Boston.

The Swiss Ambassador to the United States is Ralf Heckner.

== See also ==
- Foreign relations of Switzerland
- List of diplomatic missions of Switzerland
- Switzerland–United States relations
