= Fernand du Martheray =

His Excellency Fernand du Martheray
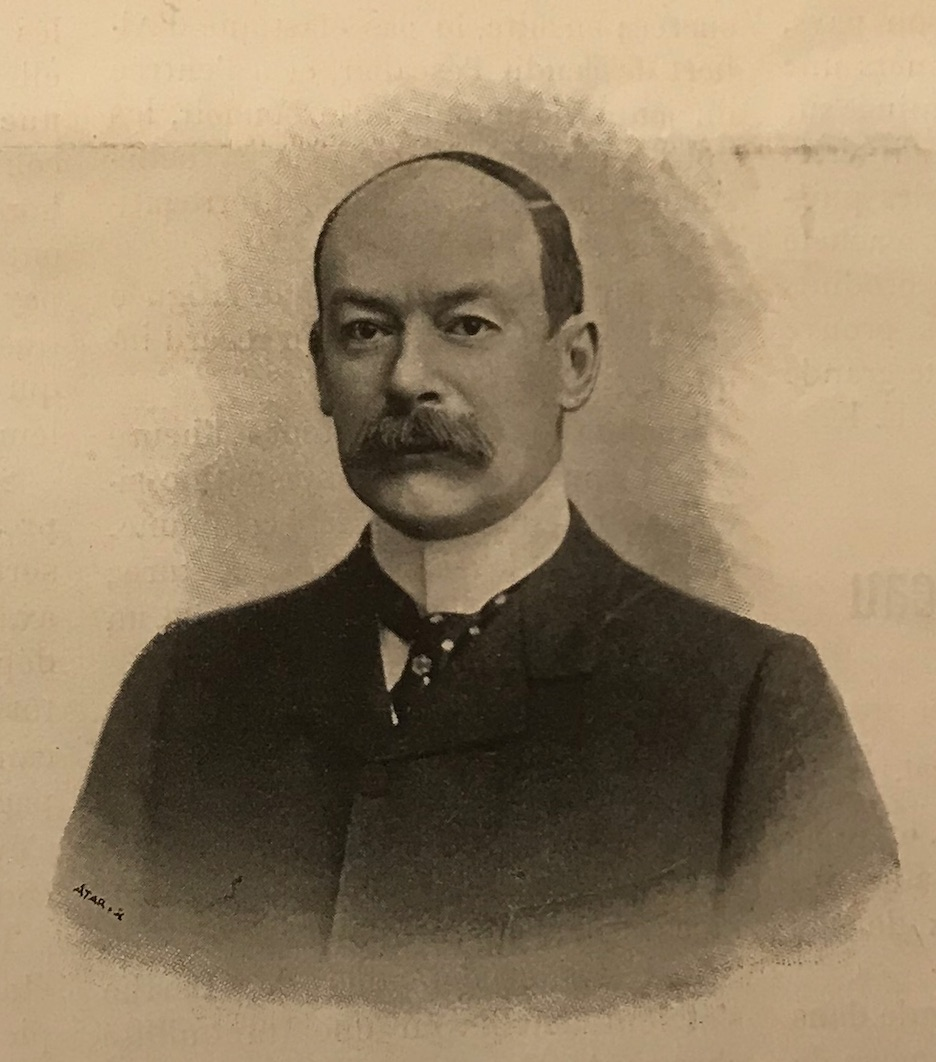
- du Martheray c. 1903

Minister of Mission of Switzerland to the United States
- In office 18 November 1902 – 31 July 1904
- Succeeded by: Leo Vogel
- Preceded by: Giovanni Battista Pioda II

Minister of Mission of Switzerland to the United States

Personal details
- Born: Fernand Dumartheray; 16 July 1860 Rolle, Switzerland
- Died: 22 May 1910 (aged 49) Vienna, Austria-Hungary (now Austria)
- Occupation: Jurist, diplomat

Fernand du Martheray (né Dumartheray; 16 July 1860 – 22 May 1910) was a Swiss jurist and diplomat who most notably served as Minister of Switzerland to the United States from 1902 to 1904.

== Early life and education ==
Du Martheray was born Fernand Dumartheray on 16 July 1860 in Rolle on Lake Geneva, Switzerland, to Eugène Dumartheray, a cantonal court judge, and Charlotte Dumartheray (née Soutter), into Swiss nobility.

== Career ==
He most notably served as Minister of Switzerland to the United States from 18 November 1902 to 31 July 1904 being appointed by the Federal Council. He later served to Austria-Hungary and was also accredited to Romania and Bulgaria.

== Personal life ==
Du Martheray died on 22 May 1910 in Vienna, Austria-Hungary from a stroke. He was never married and had no children. His estate, Domaine du Favières, subsequently was inherited by his brother Rodolphe du Martheray and his descendants.

In the 1880s, he and his brother assumed the assumingly more refined spelling of their surname du Martheray, which name change required litigation in the front of several courts.
