= Henry de Torrenté =

Swiss lawyer and diplomat

His Excellency Henry de Torrenté
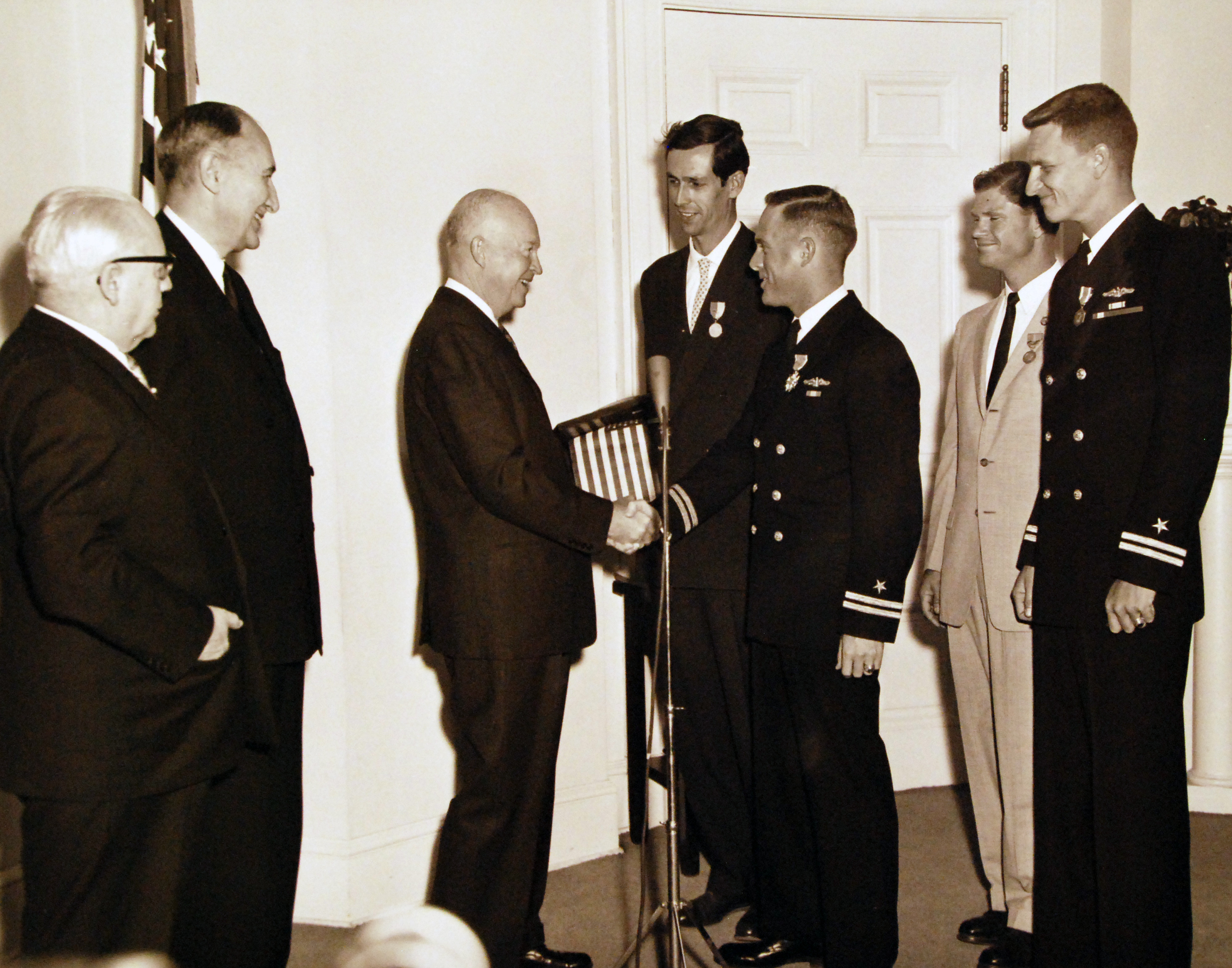
- 4 February 1960 – White House: President Dwight D. Eisenhower honours two U.S. Navy officers and two civilian scientists for the highly successful submergence tests of the Bathyscaphe Trieste. President Eisenhower congratulates Lieutenant Don Walsh, after presenting him with the Legion of Merit. Other recipients include: Jacques Piccard, fourth from right, who received the Navy Distinguished Public Service Award; Andreas Rechnitzer, second from right, who received the same award; and Robert H. Shumaker, who was awarded a Letter of Commendation (with ribbon). The Ambassador of the Swiss Confederation, Henry de Torrenté (far left, with glasses), and the United States Secretary of the Navy, William B. Franke, witness the ceremony.

Ambassador of Switzerland to the United States
- In office 12 April 1957 – 30 June 1960
- Preceded by: Carl Bruggmann
- Succeeded by: Auguste R. Lindt

Personal details
- Born: Henry Charles de Torrenté; 5 November 1893 Sierre, Switzerland
- Died: 28 March 1962 (aged 68) London, United Kingdom
- Spouse: Anne Marie de Courten (m. 1944)
- Education: University of Bern; University of Basel; University of Geneva (Licentiate, Honorary Doctorate)

Military service
- Allegiance: Switzerland
- Branch/service: Swiss Armed Forces
- Rank: Colonel

Henry Charles de Torrenté (French pronunciation: [də tɔ.ʁɑ̃.te]; 5 November 1893 – 28 March 1962) was a Swiss attorney and diplomat who most notably served as Ambassador of Switzerland to the United States from 1957 to 1960. He previously also served as an Envoy to China and the United Kingdom.

== Early life and education ==
De Torrenté was born 5 November 1893 in Sierre, Switzerland, to Henri de Torrenté (1845–1922), a notable politician and federalist, and Ida Marie Françoise de Torrenté (née de Riedmatten), who belonged to the old Patrician bourgeoisie of Valais. His ancestors served as officers in Naples for the then ruling dynasty, the House of Bourbon-Two Sicilies.

He attended the schools in Sierre and ultimately the Gymnasium of the Benedictine Einsiedeln Abbey School. After de completition of the Matura, de Torrenté studied at the University of Bern, University of Basel and the University of Geneva completing three Licentiates in Law, Social science and Economics.

In 1919, he was also admitted to the bar and became a notary public. Ultimately he completed trainee programs as an attorney, in a bank and insurance company.

== Career ==
In 1922, Henry de Torrenté joined the Federal Department of Economic Affairs (FDEA), where he participated in international conferences on social legislation.

=== The relocation of the Swiss Legation and the early war years in Paris ===
Under the direction of the Swiss envoy, Minister Alphonse Dunant, and on the recommendation of Walter Stucki, Henry de Torrenté became the head of the trade department of the Swiss Legation in Paris in 1929, located at 51 Avenue Hoche. In 1932, together with Minister Alphonse Dunant, Henry de Torrenté prepared the visit of Federal Councillor Edmund Schulthess and Walter Stucki to the Ministry for Foreign Affairs at the Quai d'Orsay. Six years later, in 1938, under the logistical responsibility of Henry de Torrenté, the legation was relocated to its new building, the Hôtel de Besenval. The Hôtel de Besenval has strong historical links to Switzerland, as it was once the residence of Pierre Victor, Baron de Besenval de Brunstatt, a Swiss military officer in French service and confidant of Queen Marie Antoinette.

==== Holding the line in Paris ====
From July 1940, after the Battle of France, the Capture of Paris and the Fall of the Third Republic on 22 June 1940, the legation in Paris served solely to represent the interests of Switzerland in Occupied France. De facto, the legation was downgraded to a consulate. However, the official downgrade did not occur until the summer of 1941 under pressure from Germany, when the Germans demanded that Switzerland no longer represents its interests in the territory of Occupied France from Paris, but from Berlin. But already in June 1940, Minister Walter Stucki, together with Legation Secretary Pierre Dupont (1912–1993) and Military and Air Attaché Colonel Richard de Blonay (1898–1968), as well as a large part of the French ruling elite, including Maréchal Philippe Pétain, who became prime minister on 16 June, had left Paris for Vichy. Meanwhile, Walter Stucki's deputy, Legation Councillor Henry de Torrenté, remained in Paris.

=== Back in Bern ===
In 1941, after the official downgrade of the legation to a consulate, Henry de Torrenté returned to Bern and joined the Federal Office of Commerce at the Federal Department of Economic Affairs (FDEA) in 1942. As the Federal Council's delegate for trade agreements, he negotiated primarily with France, Spain, Portugal, and the Allies.

=== China, United Kingdom and the USA ===
In 1945, Henry de Torrenté was appointed Envoy of the Swiss Confederation with the title of Minister (from 1957 with the title of Ambassador). In this capacity, he was appointed head of the Diplomatic and Consular Mission in China in 1946, where he opened the first Swiss Legation in Nanjing. In 1948, he was appointed Envoy of the Swiss Confederation to the United Kingdom. His term of office in London lasted until 1954. From 1955 onwards, first as Minister and from 1957 to 1960 as Ambassador, he represented Switzerland's interests in the US, with residence in Washington. In the USA he dealt mainly with issues in the fields of banking, watchmaking and science.

== Honours and death ==
In 1944, de Torrenté married Anne Marie de Courten, with whom he had two daughters;

- Marie-Josèphe de Torrenté
- Stéphanie de Torrenté

Henry de Torrenté was an honorary doctor of the University of Geneva and a colonel in the General Staff (Oberst im Generalstab). He died on 28 March 1962 in London, United Kingdom aged 69.
