= Martin Dahinden =

Swiss diplomat

His Excellency Martin Dahinden
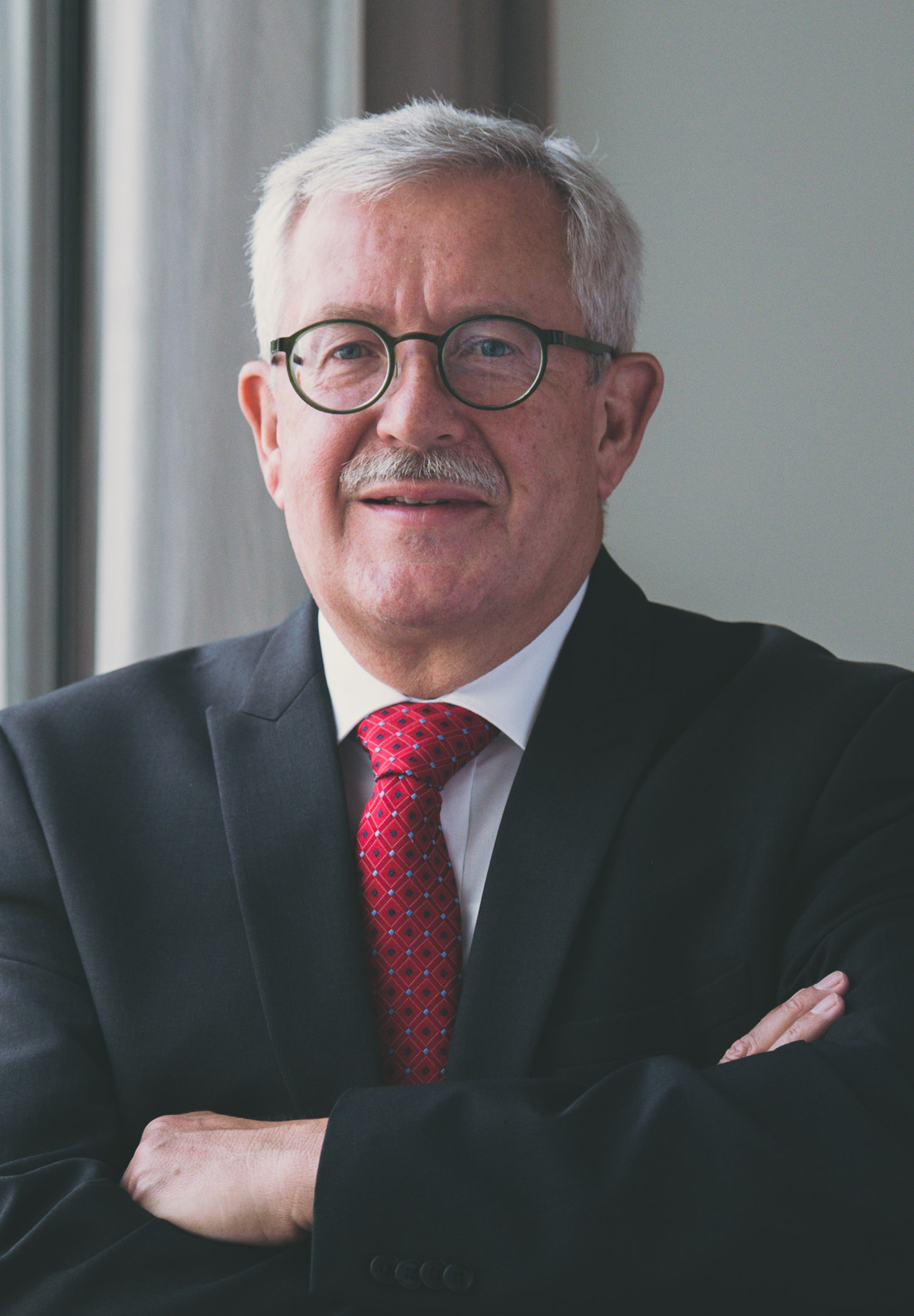
- Dahinden in 2018

Swiss Ambassador to the United States
- In office November 18, 2014 – 2019
- Preceded by: Manuel Sager
- Succeeded by: Jacques Pitteloud

Director of the Swiss Agency for Development and Cooperation
- In office 2008–2014

Director of Corporate Management at the Federal Department of Foreign Affairs of Switzerland
- In office 2004–2008

Personal details
- Born: Martin Dahinden; 8 January 1955 Zürich, Switzerland
- Spouse: Anita
- Children: Robert, Andrea
- Education: University of Zurich, Zürich
- Occupation: Diplomat

Martin Dahinden (German pronunciation: [ˈmaʁtiːn daˈhɪndn̩]; born 8 January 1955) is a Swiss economist, lecturer, author and diplomat who served as Ambassador of Switzerland to the United States from 2014 to 2019 (retirement).

== Mandate ==
Dahinden is the current head of the Embassy of Switzerland to the United States in Washington, D.C. His mandate is to promote exchange between Switzerland and the United States in political relations, economy and business, science, technology and culture. Switzerland also represents U.S. interests in Iran (since 1979).

For Swiss living in the U.S., the embassy and the consulates general offer services and consular protection. Dahinden presented his credentials to the President of the United States of America, Barack Obama, on November 18, 2014 at the White House in Washington, D.C.

== Career ==
Dahinden entered the diplomatic service in 1987. Early assignments included his service as a member of the Swiss delegation to the General Agreement on Tariffs and Trade, at the Embassy of Switzerland in Paris, as deputy to the Swiss ambassador in Nigeria (1989 to 1991), and in a temporary posting at the Swiss Mission to the United Nations in New York. Later, he worked in the Federal Department of Foreign Affairs' Service for Disarmament Policy and Nuclear Issues (1991 to 1995), as head of the section of the Organization for Security and Co-operation in Europe and held the position of deputy head of the OSCE Coordination Unit during the Swiss chairmanship in 1996. The following year, he was deputy head of the Swiss Mission to NATO in Brussels (1997 to 2000).

From 2000 to 2004, he was director of the Geneva International Centre for Humanitarian Demining, and from 2004 to 2008, he was the head of the Directorate of Corporate Management at the Federal Department of Foreign Affairs.

Prior to assuming the position of ambassador of Switzerland to the U.S. in 2014, Dahinden served as the director of the Swiss Agency for Development and Cooperation (2008-2014).

== Personal life ==
Born in Zürich, Switzerland, on 8 January 1955, Martin Dahinden earned a Ph.D. in economics at the University of Zurich, Switzerland.

In July 2016 Dahinden published a book about Swiss culinary art and its influence on American cuisine. In 2018, he published a second book about the Swiss contribution to the culinary history. In addition, Dahinden was chairman of the Diplomatic Cabinet of the National Portrait Gallery and of the Ambassadors Circle of the National Building Museum. He is also a member of the Executive Council on Diplomacy and of the Diplomatic Advisory Board of the Economic Club of Washington D.C and patron of the Choral Arts Society of Washington.

== Publications ==
- Martin Dahinden: Swiss security policy and partnership with NATO. Nato Review, No.4 Winter 1999 - Volume 47, pp. 24–25. http://www.nato.int/docu/rev-pdf/eng/9904-en.pdf
- Martin Dahinden: The Response to the Humanitarian Crisis Created by Landmines. Cambridge Review of International Affairs, Volume 15, Issue 1, 2002. http://www.tandfonline.com/doi/abs/10.1080/09557570220126261
- Martin Dahinden: "War from the Victims‘ Perspective: Photographs by Jean Mohr", Opening Remarks at the Woodrow Wilson International Center for Scholars, November 20, 2014. http://www.swissemb.org/downloads/AmbSpeech_WarFromVictim%27sPerspective_Nov2014.pdf
- Martin Dahinden: "Schweizer Küchengeheimnisse", Nagel & Kimche, 2016
- Martin Dahinden: "Beyond Muesli and Fondue. The Swiss Contribution to Culinary History", Booklocker.com, 2018
- Martin Dahinden: "Woodrow Wilson Vermächtnis und die Schweiz", in "9783725578849/Notter-Markus-Hrsg.-Weber-Rolf-H.-Hrsg.-Heinemann-Andreas-Hrsg.-Baumgartner-Tobias-Hrsg./Europaeische-Idee-und-Integration---mittendrin-und-nicht-dabei Europäische Idee und Integration - mittendrin und nicht dabei?" (Notter/Weber/Heinemann/Baumgartner), Schulthess, 2018
- Martin Dahinden: Bibliography
