= Manuel Sager =

Swiss diplomat

Swiss Ambassador to the United States
- In office December 2010 – October 2014
- Preceded by: Urs Ziswiler
- Succeeded by: Martin Dahinden

Director of the Swiss Agency for Development and Cooperation
- In office 2014–2020

Personal details
- Born: 1955 (age 70–71) Menziken, Aargau, Switzerland
- Spouse: Christine
- Education: Duke University Law School; University of Zurich

Manuel Sager (born 1955, Menziken, Aargau) is a Swiss diplomat who served as the Ambassador of Switzerland to the United States from 2010 to 2014. He was appointed to the position in December 2010.

== Early years ==
He attended graduate school in North Carolina, worked as a lawyer in Arizona and held diplomatic posts in New York City and Washington, DC.

Born in 1955 in Menziken in the canton of Aargau, Sager earned a doctorate from the law school of the University of Zurich. He later conducted postgraduate studies in the U.S., receiving a master’s of law degree from Duke University Law School.

In 1986, Sager passed the bar in the state of Arizona and worked as an associate attorney at the law firm of O’Connor, Cavanagh in Phoenix for two years, specializing in patent law.

== Political career ==
In 1988, he began his career with the Federal Department of Foreign Affairs (FDFA) and was posted as a diplomat-in-training in Bern, Switzerland, and Athens, Greece.

From 1990 to 1995, he worked in the FDFA’s Directorate of International Law in Bern, and he headed the Division for Humanitarian Law 1993–1995.

He had his first diplomatic tour in the U.S. from 1995 to 1999, serving as deputy consul general in New York. He then shifted to the Swiss embassy in Washington, DC, to handle communications from 1999 to 2001.

Sager was head of the Coordination Office for Humanitarian Law for the Directorate of International Law from November 2001 to September 2002. For the next four months, he was head of communications for the Federal Department of Foreign Affairs, after which he moved on to the same position in the Federal Department of Economic Affairs.

From October 2005 to July 2008, Sager was an executive director at the European Bank for Reconstruction and Development in London, in charge of nine countries, including those in the ex-Soviet Union. He then took over as head of the FDFA’s Political Affairs Division (2008–2010).

== Family life ==
Sager met his American-born wife, Christine, at a youth hostel in Oregon in 1982 while both were travelling around the United States. They were married 11 months later.

== Hobbies ==
Sager is a guitarist and playing guitar is his favorite leisure activity.
