= Giovanni Battista Pioda II =

Swiss diplomat (1850-1914)

His Excellency Giovanni Battista Pioda II
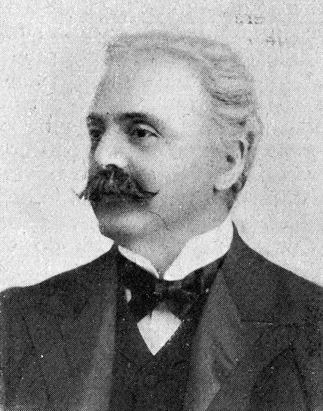
- Official portrait, 1902

Minister of Mission of Switzerland to Italy
- In office 31 July 1902 - 30 November 1914 (his death)
- President: Ernst Brenner
- Preceded by: Gaston Carlin

Minister of Mission of Switzerland to the United States
- In office 23 November 1894 - 30 July 1902
- President: Emil Frey
- Preceded by: Alfred de Claparède

Personal details
- Born: Giovanni Battista Pioda; 24 April 1850 Lugano, Switzerland
- Died: 30 November 1914 (aged 64) Anzio, Kingdom of Italy (now Italy)
- Spouse: Maria Federici

Giovanni Battista Pioda II (24 April 1850 – 30 November 1914) colloquially also Giovan Battista Pioda and Jean Baptiste Pioda was a Swiss diplomat who served Minister of Switzerland to Italy from 1902 to 1914 succeeding Gaston Carlin. Previously he served as Minister of Switzerland to the United States in Washington, D.C. between 1894 and 1902 succeeding Alfred de Claparède. He was among the first professional diplomats of Switzerland.

== Early life and education ==
Pioda was born 24 April 1850 in Lugano, Switzerland, to Giovanni Battista Pioda Sr., a state attorney, diplomat and member of the Federal Council (Switzerland), and Anna Pioda (née Sozzi). His brothers include Carlo Eugenio Pioda and Gioachimo Pioda. He studied law in Switzerland and Italy completing a Licentiate degree in Rome in 1880.
