= Anton Robert Hegner =

Swiss businessman and diplomat (1926–1999)

His Excellency Anton Robert Hegner

Ambassador of Switzerland to the United States
- In office 25 August 1980 – 7 March 1984
- Preceded by: Raymond Probst
- Succeeded by: Klaus Jacobi

Personal details
- Born: Anton Robert Hegner; 22 February 1926 Kobe, Japan
- Died: February 1999 (aged 72–73)
- Spouse: Barbara von Stockar-Scherer-Castell (m. 1958)
- Relations: Hans A. Sulzer (uncle)
- Occupation: Businessman; Diplomat

Anton Robert Hegner (22 February 1926 – 1999) was a Swiss businessman and diplomat who most notably served as Ambassador of Switzerland to the United States from 1980 to 1984 as well as Ambassador to the United Nations from 1984 to 1985. He previously held a variety of diplomatic posts in Berlin, Buenos Aires and London.

== Early life and education ==
Hegner was born 22 February 1926 in Kobe, Japan, one of three children, to Robert Siber Hegner (1890–1970), a businessman and economic advisor, and Ella Hegner (née Weber; 1888–1981), into an affluent Protestant family.

His paternal family belonged to the old bourgeoisie of Winterthur. His father was the president of Siber, Hegner & Co, a multinational merchant firm, initially in Kobe and Shanghai before returning to Zurich in 1928. His maternal family was active in the textile industry in Winterthur since the early 19th century. He was also a descendant of the noble Juvalta family from Grisons.

Hegner completed a Doctor of Philosophy at the University of Zurich, University of Paris and the University of Vienna.

== Personal life ==
In 1958, Hegner married Barbara von Stockar-Scherer-Castell (1933–2018), daughter of Maximilian von Stockar-Scherer-Castell and Louise von Stockar-Scherer-Castell (née de Meuron), of Amsoldingen Castle, and part of Swiss nobility.
