= Embassy of the United States, Bern =

U.S. Embassy in Switzerland and Liechtenstein

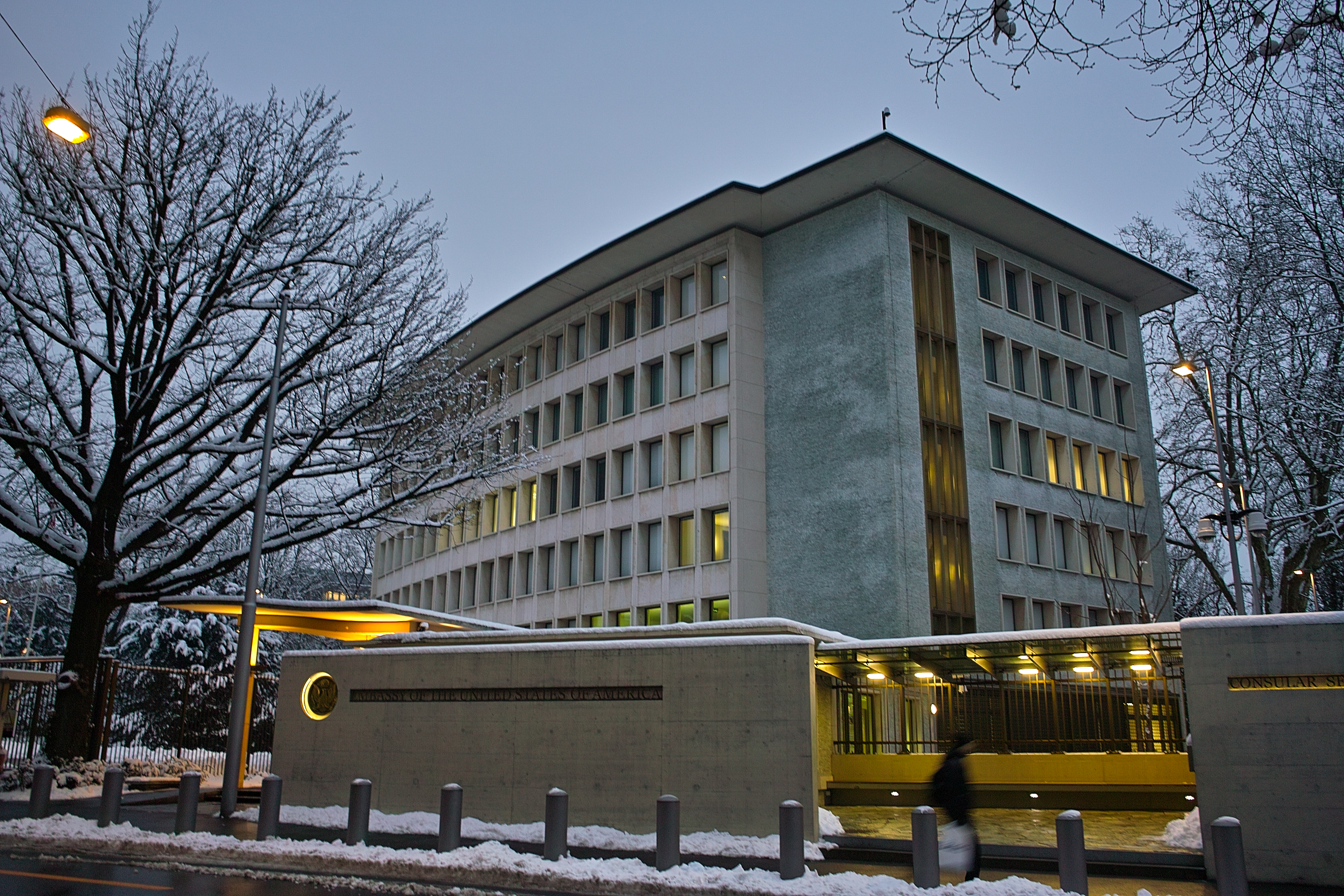
- Address: Sulgeneckstrasse 19 CH-3007 Bern, Switzerland
- Coordinates: 46.94346288986347°N 7.438188426703054°E
- Opened: 1953

The Embassy of the United States in Bern manages the official relationship between the United States and the Swiss Confederation and the Principality of Liechtenstein. The diplomatic mission of the United States was established in April 1853 as a legation, and was elevated to an embassy in 1953. Within the Embassy, several U.S. agencies are represented, including the Department of State, Department of Defense, Department of Commerce, and Department of Justice. The mission aims to foster strong bilateral ties and advance U.S. policy objectives in Europe. It also provides services such as visa issuance and emergency assistance to Americans in Switzerland.

== History ==
Consular relations between the U.S. and Switzerland trace back to the 1820s. The U.S. established diplomatic relations with Switzerland in 1853, following Switzerland's unification. Switzerland, known for its stability and strong economy, resonates with many of the democratic ideals held by the U.S. Over the years, the two countries have inked several agreements to strengthen their relationship, such as the Enhanced Political Cooperation Framework and the U.S.-Swiss Joint Economic Commission. The Legation was elevated to Embassy status in 1953, with Frances E. Willis becoming the first U.S. Ambassador to Switzerland.

=== Addition of Liechtenstein ===
Since 1997, the U.S. ambassador to Switzerland has also been accredited to the Principality of Liechtenstein. Appointed on February 10, 1997, Ambassador Madeleine M. Kunin served as the first United States Ambassador to Liechtenstein. She presented her credentials to Liechtenstein on March 14, 1997, which marked the beginning of the United States' diplomatic relations with the country.

Although the United States executed its first treaty with Liechtenstein in 1926, at the time, and until 1997, Liechtenstein was represented diplomatically by Switzerland.

Before 1997 it was understood that the rights of a U.S.–Swiss agreement also extended to citizens of Liechtenstein because it had yielded control of its foreign affairs to Switzerland. At the end of the 20th century, however, it "began pursuing independent membership in international organizations".

== Notable events ==
Tina Turner initiated the process of relinquishing her U.S. citizenship in 2013. She signed the paperwork to relinquish her American citizenship at the US embassy in Bern on October 24, 2013. There has been a general trend of wealthy citizens renouncing their citizenship to reduce their tax burden, with over 300 cases in Switzerland alone as of 2021.

== See also ==
- List of ambassadors of the United States to Switzerland and Liechtenstein
