= Alfred de Claparède =

His Excellency Alfred de Claparède
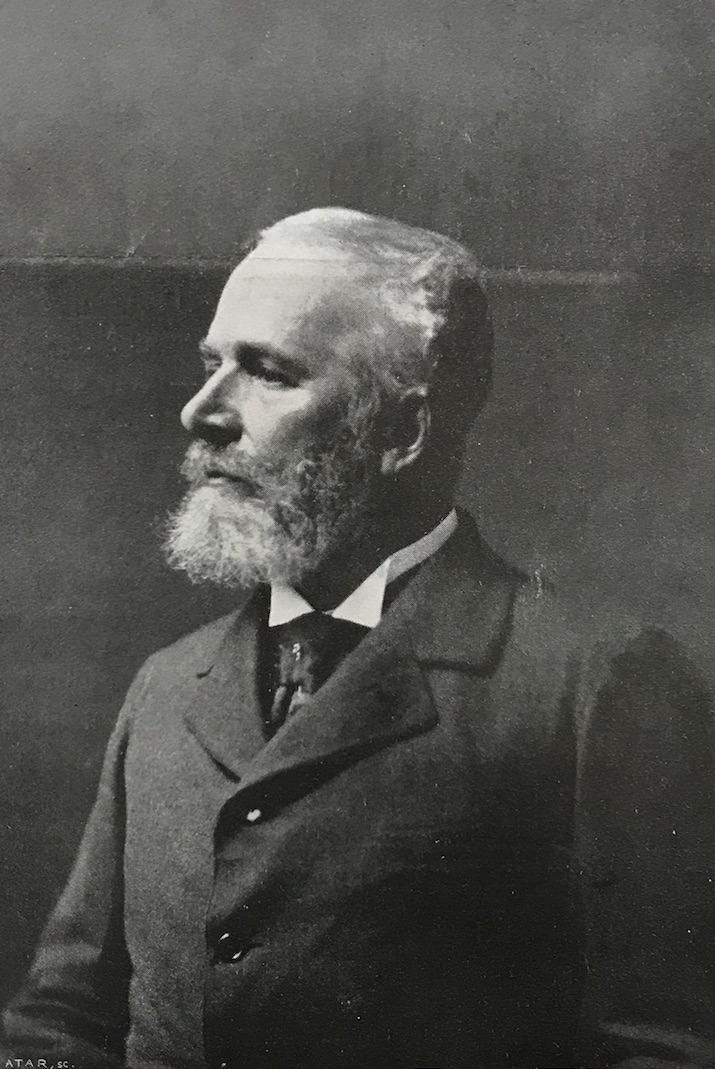
- De Claparède in 1904

Minister of Mission of Switzerland to the United States
- In office 18 April 1888 – 1 January 1893
- President: Wilhelm Hertenstein
- Preceded by: Emil Frey
- Succeeded by: Giovanni Battista Pioda

Minister of Mission of Switzerland to the German Empire
- In office 1881 - 1887
- President: Wilhelm Matthias Naeff

Personal details
- Born: Alfred de Claparède; 10 February 1842 Geneva, Switzerland
- Died: 22 September 1922 (aged 80) Berlin, Weimar Republic (now Germany)
- Spouse: Catherine Caroline Crola (m. 1866)
- Children: 2

Alfred de Claparède (French pronunciation: [də klapaʁɛːd]; 10 February 1842 - 27 September 1922) was a Swiss diplomat who most notably served as Minister to the Mission of Switzerland in the German Empire from 1881 to 1887, meanwhile also chargé d'affaires for Austria-Hungary in 1883. Most notably between 1888 and 1893 he served as Minister to the Mission of Switzerland to the United States succeeding Emil Frey.

== Early life and education ==
De Claparède was born 10 February 1842 in Geneva, Republic of Geneva, to Charles-Claude de Claparède, a member of the executive council of Geneva, and Anne-Louise de Claparède (née Brunner). His family was Protestant and originally of Languedoc, France, becoming citizens in Geneva in 1724.

He studied Law at the University of Geneva, University of Bonn and the University of Berlin graduating in 1866 with a Juris Doctor. He entered diplomatic service in 1869 becoming the first professional diplomat of Switzerland.

== Diplomatic career ==
De Claparède served as minister of the Mission of Switzerland to the German Empire from 1881 to 1887. He served in Washington, D.C., from 18 April 1888 to 1 January 1893, becoming the second Swiss minister to the United States succeeding Emil Frey. Posts thereafter included Austria and Sweden.

== Personal life ==
In 1866, de Claparède married Catherine Caroline Crola, a daughter of Georges-Henri Crola and Elise Concorde (née Fraenkel), with whom he had two sons;

- Huges de Claparède, colloquially Hugo, (1870–1947), a professor at the University of Geneva.
- Alfred René de Claparède (1888–1979), who was also a diplomat serving in a variety of posts across Europe.

De Claparède died 27 September 1922 in Berlin, Weimar Republic (presently Germany), aged 80.
