= Proposed Switzerland-United States Free Trade Agreement =

Proposed free trade agreement between Switzerland and the United States

Initial discussions about a free trade agreement (FTA) between Switzerland and the United States have been ongoing since the early 2000s. The closest the two countries have become to formally beginning such negotiations was in 2006, though these attempts were suspended, mainly because of the resistance from the Swiss agricultural sector. In 2018, Swiss trade representatives revived the proposal by attracting interest from some U.S. officials such as Ambassador (under the first Trump Administration) Edward McMullen. Since then, formal negotiations have yet to be initiated though the topic continues to come up in economic policy discussions, though some Swiss commentators believe the Biden administration is less receptive than its predecessor. After the Trump administration imposed a tariff of 32% on Swiss imports in April 2025, some of Switzerland's political parties (such as the FDP) re-emphasized the urgent need for an FTA to be negotiated. Others, declared opposition to such a move, citing the need to move closer to the European Union instead. In May 2025, Swiss President Karin Keller-Sutter called for an "accelerated" approach to free trade talks, though no agreement has yet been inked as of mid-June 2025.

On August 1 2025, the Trump administration imposed tariffs of 39% on all Swiss imports, significantly higher than tariffs imposed on the European Union. On 14 November 2025, it was announced by the two countries that the U.S. will reduce its tariffs on Swiss goods to 15%% under a new agreement.

== Procedure ==
Under Swiss law, if a sufficient number of signatures are collected by registered voters within a certain timeframe after both houses of parliament pass the respective deal, any free trade agreements are put to the vote in a nationwide referendum. In a such referendum, a simple majority of nationwide cast votes ("Yes" votes) in favor of the agreement is required for it to come into force. Of the dozens of agreements Switzerland has signed with other countries, only one has ever gone through review by referendum, namely the agreement with Indonesia in 2021: 51.6% of voters ended up approving it.

== Economic relations ==
Switzerland and the United States have long been key economic partners, particularly in terms of foreign direct investment and foreign portfolio investment. U.S. foreign direct investment (FDI) in Switzerland (stock) was $212.2 billion in 2022, whereas Switzerland's FDI in the United States (stock) was $307.2 billion in 2022.

On trade, Switzerland has a surplus with the U.S: In 2022, Switzerland imported goods worth 37.5 billion (just over 40 billion in US Dollars as per the average 2022 exchange rate) Swiss Francs from the US and exported goods worth CHF 62.4 billion Swiss Francs (worth around 65 billion US dollars as per the average 2022 exchange rate), making the U.S. the leading export destination for goods from Switzerland. U.S. official trade figures show a trade deficit with Switzerland since 2013. Pharmaceuticals are the primary goods imported by the US from Switzerland, while Switzerland's largest imports from the U.S. are chemical end-products and active chemical agents.

== Analysis ==
A study released by independent Swiss free-market liberal think tank Avenir Suisse and endorsed by the U.S. Embassy in Switzerland concluded that a trade agreement between Switzerland and the U.S. would net positively affect both. Within five years, trade in goods could increase by more than $14 billion and more than 40,000 new jobs could be created – 27,500 of them in the United States and 13,500 in Switzerland.

A more critical commentator at Swiss economic magazine Handelszeitung stated in November 2018 that, despite the fact that 15% of Swiss non-agricultural exports go to the United States, the customs hurdles to reaching the US market are considerable: "Swiss [non-agricultural] companies had to hand over 300 million francs in customs duties to the US authorities in 2017.The savings that the [non-agricultural sectors] of the Swiss economy could achieve through an agreement are eight times higher than that of their U.S. counterparts. This discrepancy is largely due to the fact that three-quarters of U.S. exports to Switzerland already carry very little if any customs duty. In the estimation of the article's author, Switzerland would need to incorporate the agricultural sector into any agreement to make it worthwhile for the U.S.

Two scholars at the University of St Gallen believe a Swiss-U.S. free trade agreement would need to go beyond customs duty and toll reduction and "...include the unification of industry standards, procedures and regulations" for different sectors.

One Swiss sector that is projected to be positively affected by a Swiss-US FTA is that of pharmaceuticals.

== Advocacy ==
=== Support ===
U.S. advocates of such an agreement include the conservative Heritage Foundation, which sees "Switzerland's strong commitment to free-market capitalism" as showing that it is "an ideal partner for an America seeking to reassert and deepen its own commitment to economic freedom." Other U.S. supporters include the Foundation for Economic Education. The U.S-based American Swiss Foundation also supports a free trade agreement.

In Switzerland, all major center to right-wing parties support beginning negotiations for a Free Trade Agreement with the United States. This includes the nationalist right-wing Swiss People's Party, Switzerland's largest political party.

After the 2024 election of Donald Trump, Switzerland's main corporate union Economiesuisse stated that it deems the restarting of negotiations towards an agreement with the U.S. an "absolute necessity", even if agricultural goods are not excluded from such a deal. This sentiment was echoed on November 30, 2024 by the vice-chairwoman of the Swiss People's Party and businesswoman Magdalena Martullo-Blocher. Martullo-Blocher announced her party's plans to initiate direct contacts with leading U.S. Republicans to kickstart the negotiations.

=== Opposition ===
The Green Party of Switzerland declared its opposition to a free-trade agreement with the U.S in 2005, citing concerns about importation of American genetically modified meat and dairy products.

Swiss farmer's Associations generally oppose the trade deal on the basis of agricultural food safety regulations purportedly being much less stringent in the United States than in Switzerland.

Switzerland's second-largest political party, the Swiss Social Democratic Party (SP-PS), declared its opposition to a deal in April 2025. In an interview, party chairwoman Mattea Meyer cited Donald Trump's attempt to "divide Europe" through tariffs as the main reason not to pursue negotiations with the United States "at this time".

== Developments ==
In 2006, Switzerland and the United States established the joint Trade and Investment Cooperation Forum (TICF).

Switzerland planned beginning negotiations for an agreement with then-U.S. President Trump due to the latter's attendance at the 2019 World Economic Forum in Davos. Per Reuters, President Trump affirmed his support for a trade deal in talks with Swiss president Ueli Maurer in 2019.

U.S. Ambassador to Switzerland under the Biden Administration, Scott Miller, revealed in a November 2023 interview with economic magazine Finanz und Wirtschaft that the two countries were close to an agreement around 2019-2020, but that Swiss negotiators wanted to exempt the agricultural sector from the treaty, which the U.S. side opposed.

In February 2025, Helene Budliger Artieda, who leads the Swiss State Secretariat for Economic Affairs (SECO), stressed the importance of resuming talks for a free trade deal with the United States.

In November 2025, it was announced that Switzerland will cut import duties on a variety of American goods in step with the United States, in return for tariff relief (from 39% to 15%). Besides all industrial goods and fish and seafood, this also applies to US agricultural products that Switzerland deems non-sensitive. Switzerland will offer the US duty-free bilateral tariff quotas of 500 tons of beef, 1,000 tons of bison meat and 1,500 tons of poultry. Further, as part of the deal Swiss firms intend to carry out direct investments in the United States worth $200 billion (CHF 159 billion) by the end of 2028, with part of this money earmarked for initiatives that reinforce vocational training. This is not a comprehensive free trade agreement as was proposed in the past, but rather places Switzerland on a more even playing field with the European Union in terms of tariff rate (15%).
