= Marc Peter =

Swiss politician and diplomat (1873–1966)

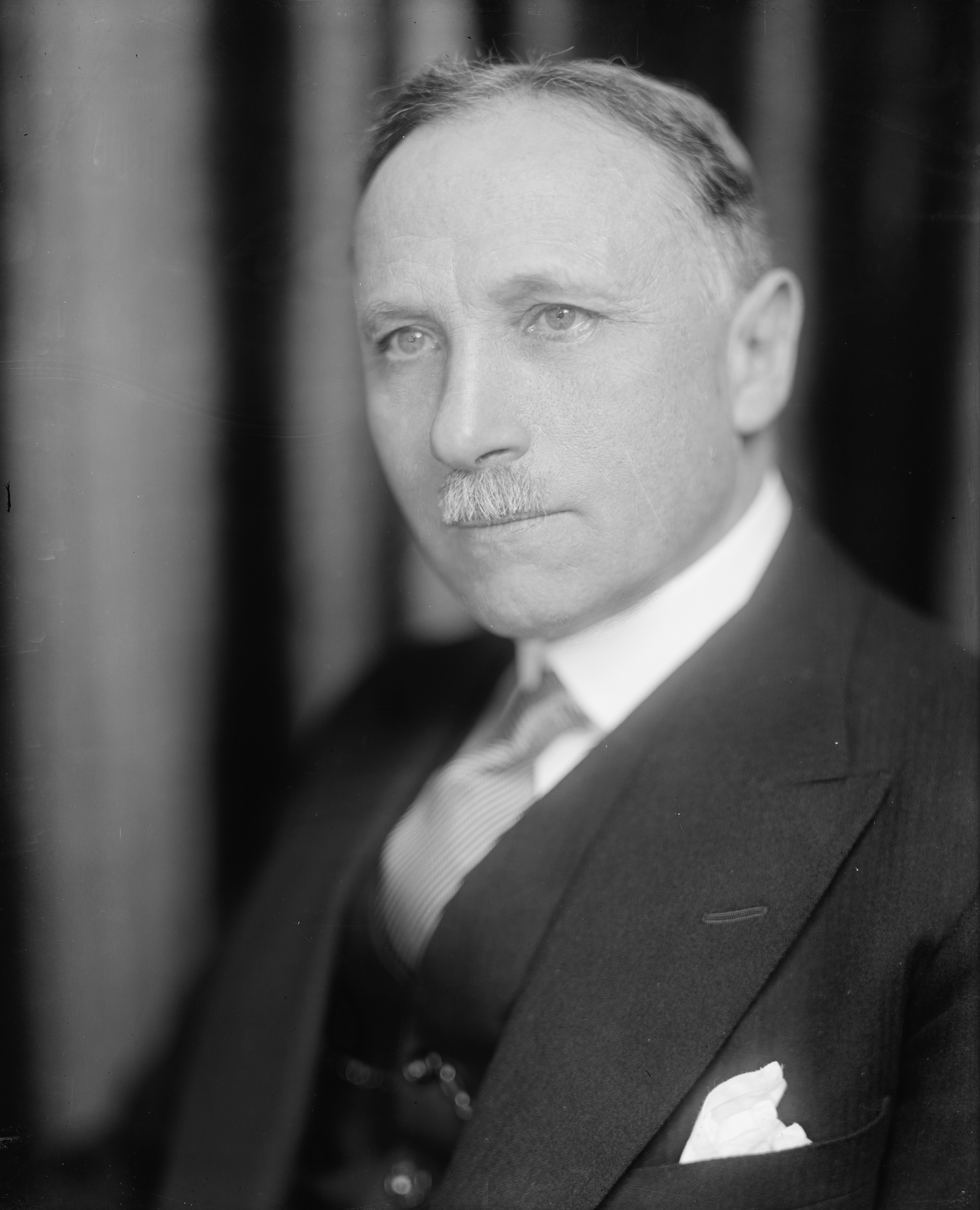
- Marc Peter, 1905

Minister of Mission of Switzerland to the United States
- In office 25 December 1919 – 30 November 1939
- Preceded by: Hans A. Sulzer
- Succeeded by: Carl Bruggmann

Member of National Council (Switzerland)
- In office 4 December 1911 – 1 November 1919

Personal details
- Born: Marc Ernest Peter; 21 December 1873 Pregny-Chambésy, Switzerland
- Died: 5 September 1966 (aged 92) Geneva, Switzerland
- Spouse: Jeanne Lachenal
- Occupation: Attorney; politician; author; diplomat

Military service
- Branch/service: Swiss Armed Forces
- Rank: Captain

Marc Ernest Peter (French pronunciation: [mark ɛʁ.nɛst pe.tɛʁ]; 21 December 1873 – 5 September 1966) was a Swiss attorney, author, politician and diplomat. Most notably he served on the National Council from 1911 to 1919. He did also serve as judge, city president of Versoix and the Grand Council of Geneva.

Subsequently, Peter was the Minister to the Mission of Switzerland to the United States in Washington, D.C., succeeding Hans A. Sulzer from 1920 to 1939. Peter remained in the United States until 1946, where he lastly was the representative for the International Committee of the Red Cross.

== Early life and education ==
Peter was born 21 December 1873 in Pregny (presently Pregny-Chambésy) to David Peter, an engraver, and Louise (née Keller), into a Protestant family. His father was of Bernese descent originally from Radelfingen.

He completed studies law at the University of Geneva and the University of Berlin graduating with a Juris Doctor in 1897.

== Diplomatic career ==
After holding several public offices in Switzerland, Peter was appointed Minister to the Mission of Switzerland to the United States in Washington, D.C., serving between 25 December 1919 and 30 November 1939.

== Personal life ==
Peter married Jeanne Lachenal, the daughter of Adrien Lachenal, who was the President of Switzerland in 1896.
