= Switzerland–United States relations =

- Switzerland: United States

Diplomatic mission
- Embassy of Switzerland, Washington, D.C.: Embassy of the United States, Bern

Envoy
- Swiss Ambassador to the United States Ralf Heckner: American Ambassador to Switzerland Scott Miller

Diplomatic relations between Switzerland and the United States were established in 1853 by the U.S. and in 1868 by Switzerland. The first diplomatic representation of the U.S. was established in Basel in 1853.

== History ==
=== Consular relations ===
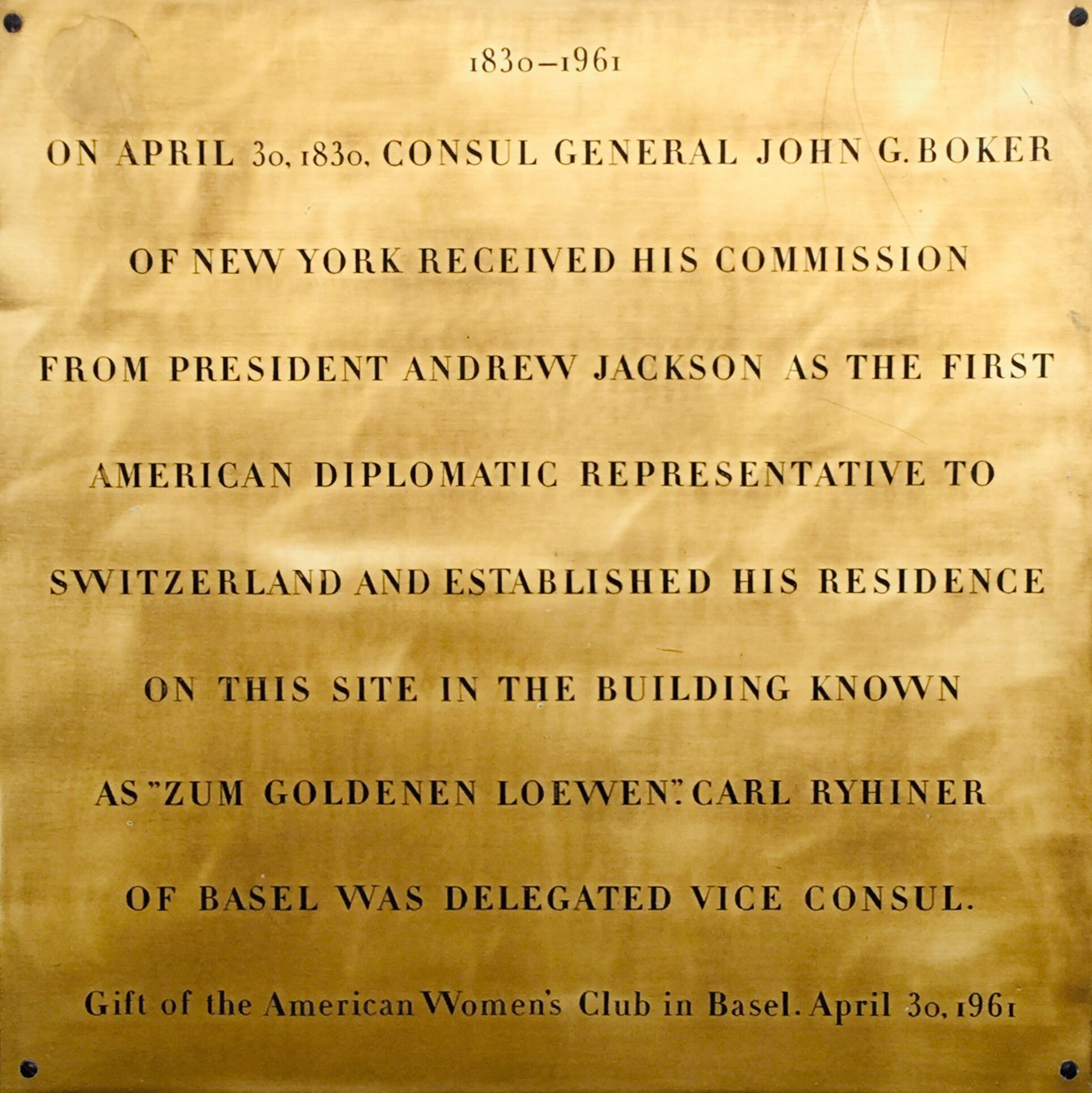
Commemorative plaque of the first American diplomatic representation in Switzerland, in Basel

With the conclusion of the Napoleonic Wars, many Swiss sought a more peaceful and prosperous life in America. A sizable number emigrated to the United States, especially from the cantons of Vaud and Lucerne. As early as 1815, representatives from the two respective cantons had proposed to the Federal Diet that the country establish a consulate in either Philadelphia or New York City to ensure the rights of their merchants and expatriates. The following year the Diet resolved to create a consulate in New York. It was initially decided that their consul would be chosen from the Swiss population in America, but no appointment was ever made. In July 1822, with consultation from Swiss–American diplomat Albert Gallatin, the Diet appointed its first two consuls to the United States: Henry Casimir de Rham of Yverdon-les-Bains, canton of Vaud, a banker and merchant and then-resident of New York; and Antoine Charles Cazenove of Geneva, a wine and tobacco merchant and then-resident of Alexandria, Virginia. Niklaus Rudolf von Wattenwyl, the chairman of the Diet, sent a letter to United States President James Monroe, asking him to grant the appointees an exequatur and emphasizing the liberal and federal characteristics shared by both of their countries' constitutions. The letter marked the first official correspondence between the governments of Switzerland and the United States and established a precedent for the character of relations between them throughout the rest of the 1800s.

The United States granted the exequatur. Gallatin advised the Diet on how to divide the territory to be administered by the two new consuls. De Rham assumed responsibility for a district encompassing the New England states, New York, New Jersey, Pennsylvania, Delaware, and the states north of the Ohio River. Cazenove managed the remainder of the United States. Their main charge was to protect the interests and property of Swiss immigrants and travelers, particularly merchants. Both performed their duties in an honorary capacity outside of their regular business, with de Rham serving until 1842 and Cazenove until 1852. The latter's responsibilities in his later service became increasingly diplomatic.

Switzerland's cotton and silk exports to the United States increased significantly throughout the 1820s, making it more desirable for the latter to establish its own consulate. In 1830, John G. Boker, businessman from New York City and a friend of Chief Clerk of the Department of State Daniel Brent, was appointed to be the first American consul to Switzerland. He arrived that fall in Bern and was warmly received by the chairman of the Diet. While waiting for his commission to be approved by the 22 cantons, Boker moved to Basel, as most Swiss exports to America passed through there. Impatient with the tedious nature of the decentralized government, he opened his consulate in October without official Swiss recognition.

The United States consuls in Switzerland were busy in their early years. Since their income was dependent on duties made on inspected and approved goods, many American consuls were forced to operate their own businesses for extra money, which diverted their attention from their official responsibilities. While they were on business trips, the consulate was left in the care of a vice-consul or agent, usually a hired merchant. In the absence of a consul, one agent briefly relocated the consulate to Zürich in 1843, though it was returned to Basel the following year upon the arrival of the new appointee, Seth T. Otis.

=== Diplomatic relations ===
Diplomatic relations were established in 1853 by the U.S. and in 1868 by Switzerland. The first diplomatic representation of the U.S. was established in Basel in 1853.

The U.S. Embassy in Switzerland is in Bern. The U.S. Mission to the European Office of the United Nations and other International Organizations, the U.S. Mission to the WTO, and the U.S. Delegation to the Conference on Disarmament are in Geneva. America Centers and Consular Agencies are also maintained in Zürich and Geneva. The U.S. ambassador to Switzerland is also accredited to Liechtenstein.

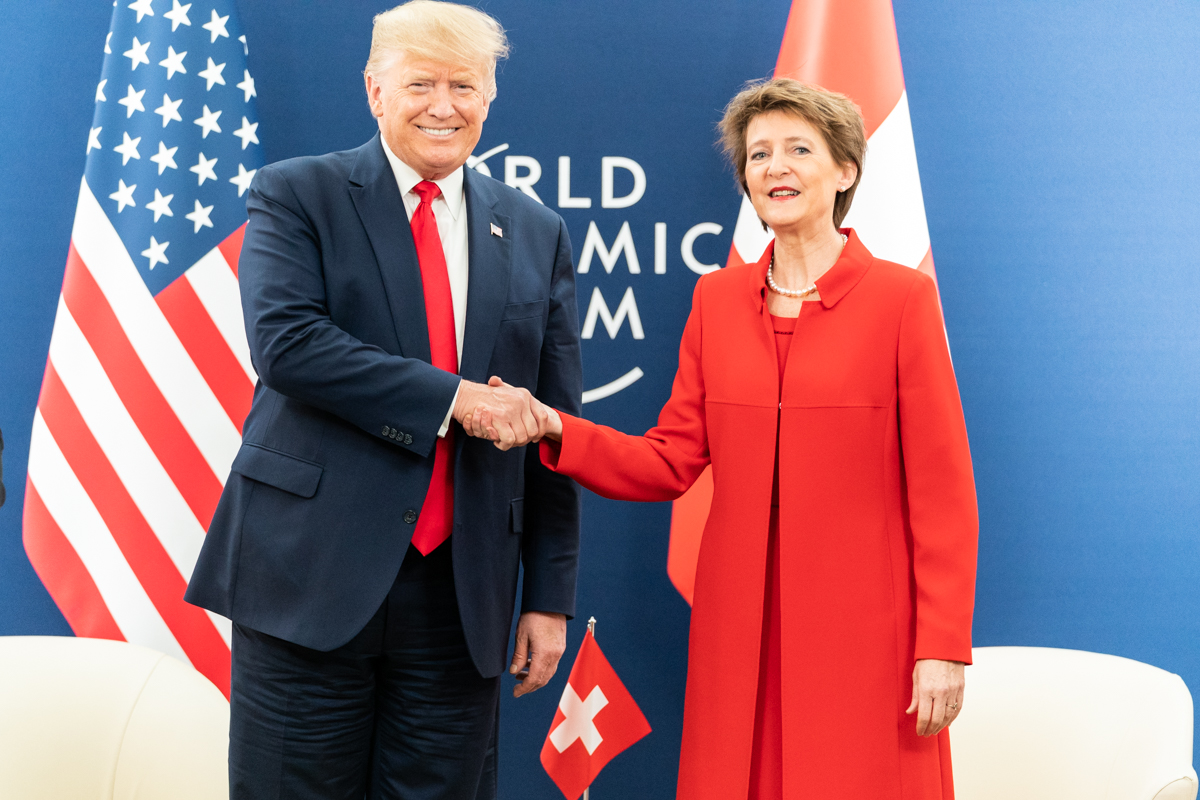
President Donald Trump meets with the President of the Swiss Confederation Simonetta Sommaruga in Davos, Switzerland in January 2020.

The relations entered a tense phase during the World Jewish Congress lawsuit against Swiss banks starting in 1995. The American government supported the heirs of the Holocaust victims and the Swiss had to re-evaluate the role of Switzerland during World War II. One of the steps taken was the publication of the names of the owners of dormant accounts in Swiss banks, with the surprise result that Renee May, deceased in 1970 and the mother of then American ambassador Madeleine Kunin was among the names.

As of January 2021, the U.S. ambassador to Switzerland is temporarily being held by Eva Weigold Schultz, and as of August 2019, the Swiss ambassador to the U.S. is Jacques Pitteloud.

Moreover, Switzerland acts as the protecting power for relations and interests between the U.S. and Iran as the United States severed relations with Iran in 1980, during the Iranian Revolution and the Iran Hostage Crisis. Between 1963 and 2015, Switzerland acted as the protecting power between Cuba and the United States, until the embassies were re-established in Havana and Washington, D.C.

Switzerland has an embassy in Washington, D.C., and maintains consulates-general in Atlanta, Chicago, New York and San Francisco and has a consulate in Boston.

On 29 March 2021, Swiss Ambassador to the U.S. Jacques Pitteloud was attacked by an unknown intruder at his residence on Cathedral Drive Northwest (attached to the embassy).

Switzerland was the country that hosted the 2021 Russia–United States summit, in Geneva.

In 2022, the Helsinki Commission stated:

Long known as a destination for war criminals and kleptocrats to stash their plunder, Switzerland is a leading enabler of Russian dictator Vladimir Putin and his cronies. After looting Russia, Putin and his oligarchs use Swiss secrecy laws to hide and protect the proceeds of their crimes.

Both countries enjoy historically close ties, common interests, shared traditions, and remarkable political similarities as federal unions of independent states with representative democracies.

== Bilateral agreements ==
The first four years of cooperation under the U.S.-Swiss Joint Economic Commission (JEC) invigorated bilateral ties by recording achievements in a number of areas, including consultations on anti-money laundering efforts, counter-terrorism, and pharmaceutical regulatory cooperation; an e-government conference; and the re-establishment of the Fulbright student/cultural exchange program.

The United States and Switzerland signed three new agreements in 2006 that will complement the JEC. The first of the new agreements is the Enhanced Political Framework and was signed by Under Secretary of State for Political Affairs Nicholas Burns and Swiss State Secretary Michael Ambühl. The second agreement is the Trade and Investment Cooperation Forum and was signed by then-U.S. Trade Representative Rob Portman and then-Economics and Trade Minister Joseph Deiss. The last agreement is the revised Operative Working Arrangement on Law Enforcement Cooperation on Counterterrorism and was signed by U.S. Attorney General Alberto Gonzales and then-Swiss Justice Minister Christoph Blocher.

In February 2013, the Swiss Federal Council allowed for the signing of the Foreign Account Tax Compliance Act (FATCA) with the United States. These agreements force all Swiss banks to inform the Internal Revenue Service of undeclared, off-shore accounts. These new regulations will be applicable by 2014, and in turn assure Swiss banks of continued operations within the U.S.

In July 2015 Switzerland and the United States signed an organic food equivalency agreement; any product certified as organic in one country may be sold as organic in the other.

In July 2019, the U.S. Senate approved the Double Taxation Treaty (DTA) with Switzerland, which was already accepted by Swiss parliament in 2010. The new agreement, applicable to accounts from September 23, 1999, onward, is amending the tax treaty of 1996 and regulates requests for information on financial accounts by U.S. authorities, as well as exemptions for retirement savings by U.S. persons.

On 16 April 2024, Swiss Federal Councillor Guy Parmelin, heading the department of economic affairs, education and research, signed the Artemis Accords during a ceremony at NASA headquarters in Washington DC. Also present were NASA Administrator Bill Nelson and Martina Hirayama, Switzerland’s state secretary for education, research and innovation. The agreement aims at peaceful and sustainable space exploration. Switzerland is not a newcomer of space research; it provided one of the first scientific instruments placed on the moon, a device to measure the solar wind during the Apollo 11 mission in 1969.

== Trade ==
Since the early 2000s, there have been discussions about enacting a bilateral free trade agreement between the two countries.

Switzerland's cumulative direct investment in the U.S. amounts to $300 billion (2020). Swiss companies directly support half-a-million jobs in the United States (2019).

Total exports of U.S. goods amounted to $18.3 billion and services (mostly business services and intellectual property licenses) over $42 billion in 2020. In terms of total trade, the United States is Switzerland's second largest trading partner, preceded by Germany and followed by China. Total U.S. direct investment in Switzerland was valued at $229 billion (2019). U.S. companies employ approximately 100,000 workers in Switzerland.

The Swiss government has bought 36 F35A fighter aircraft from Lockheed Martin (to replace its aging F/A-18 fleet) and five Patriot surface-to-air missile units from Raytheon. In 2025, the US government is demanding an additional $650 million to $1.3 billion for the 36 planes, even though the agreed purchase price was expressly agreed as a fixed price. As of 2025, Switzerland was the sixth-largest foreign investor in the U.S., and Swiss companies have created around 400,000 jobs there. The U.S. is by far the largest sales market for Swiss companies. Exports in 2024 amounted to 65.3 billion Swiss francs, 1/6 of total exports.

President Trump began his second presidency on 20 January 2025.

Initially the Trump administration imposed a tariff of 31% on Swiss goods imported to the U.S. and an interim rate of 10% until new negotiations were completed. In July 2025, the U.S. administration agreed on 39% tariffs on goods exported from Switzerland to the U.S. The business association Economiesuisse called the tariffs unjustified and "a very serious burden on the Swiss economy." On November 15, 2025 tariffs were lowered to 15% after negotiations of a Swiss delegation which brought gifts of an engraved gold bar and a Rolex desk clock. The New York Times did not report on the gifts, while the WSJ did.

Pharmaceutical companies Novartis and Roche have agreed to invest billions of dollars to increase their production capacity in the United States, following trade negociations with the Trump administration in 2026. Besides, Swiss firms have pledged some $200 billion in U.S. investments by 2028.

== Resident diplomatic missions ==
of Switzerland in the United States

- Washington, D.C. (Embassy)
- Atlanta (Consulate-General)
- Boston (Consulate)
- Chicago (Consulate-General)
- New York City (Consulate-General)
- San Francisco (Consulate-General)

of the United States in Switzerland

- Bern (Embassy)
- Geneva (Consular agency)
- Zurich (Consular agency)

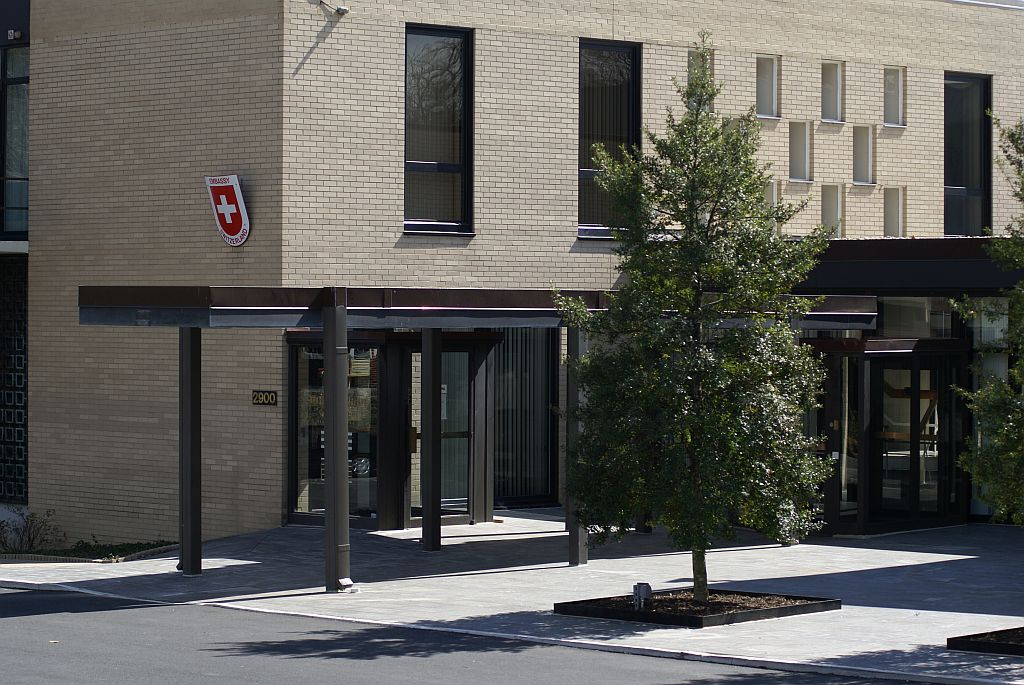
Embassy of Switzerland in Washington, D.C.

Consulate-General of Switzerland in San Francisco

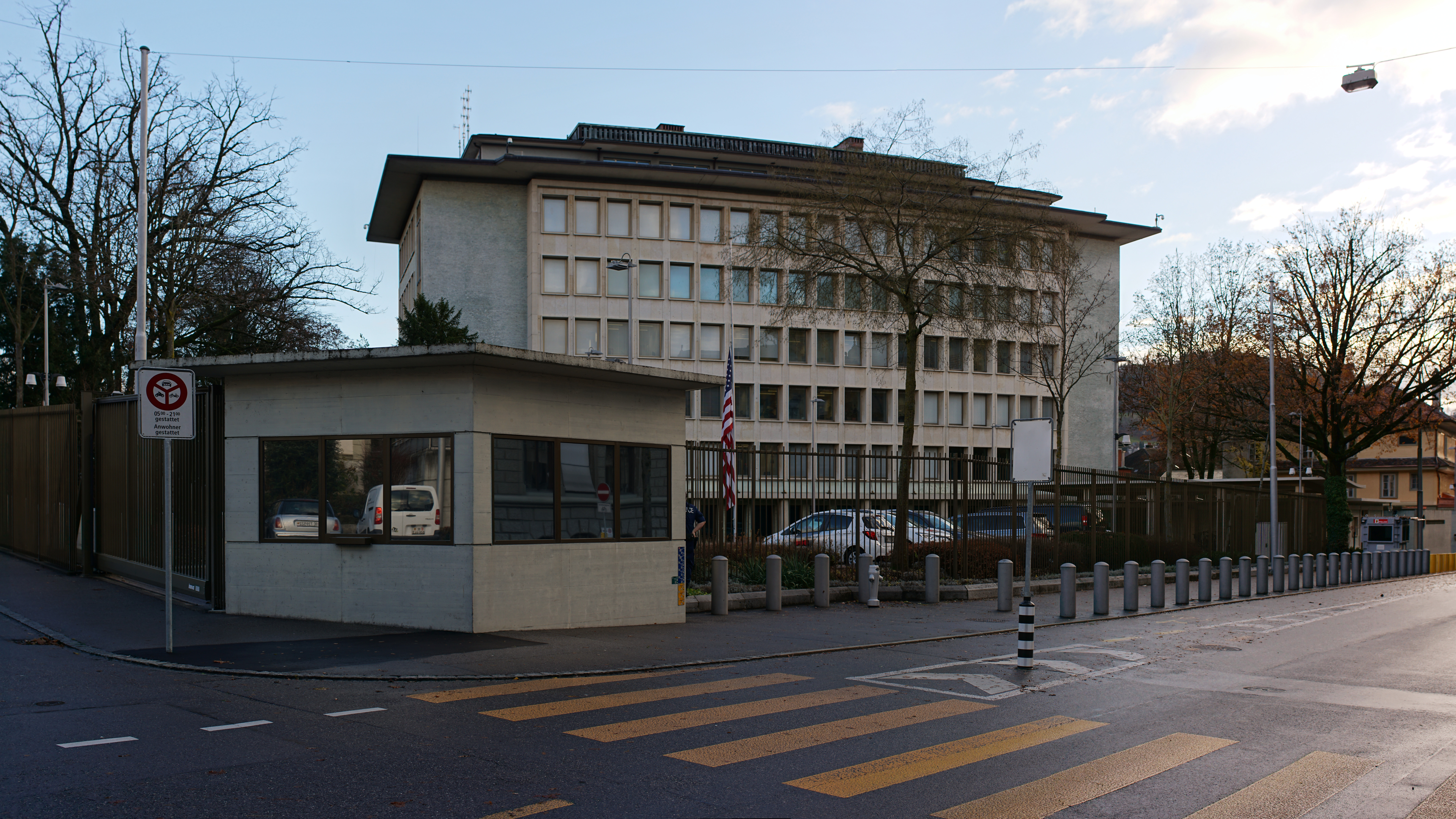
Embassy of the United States in Bern

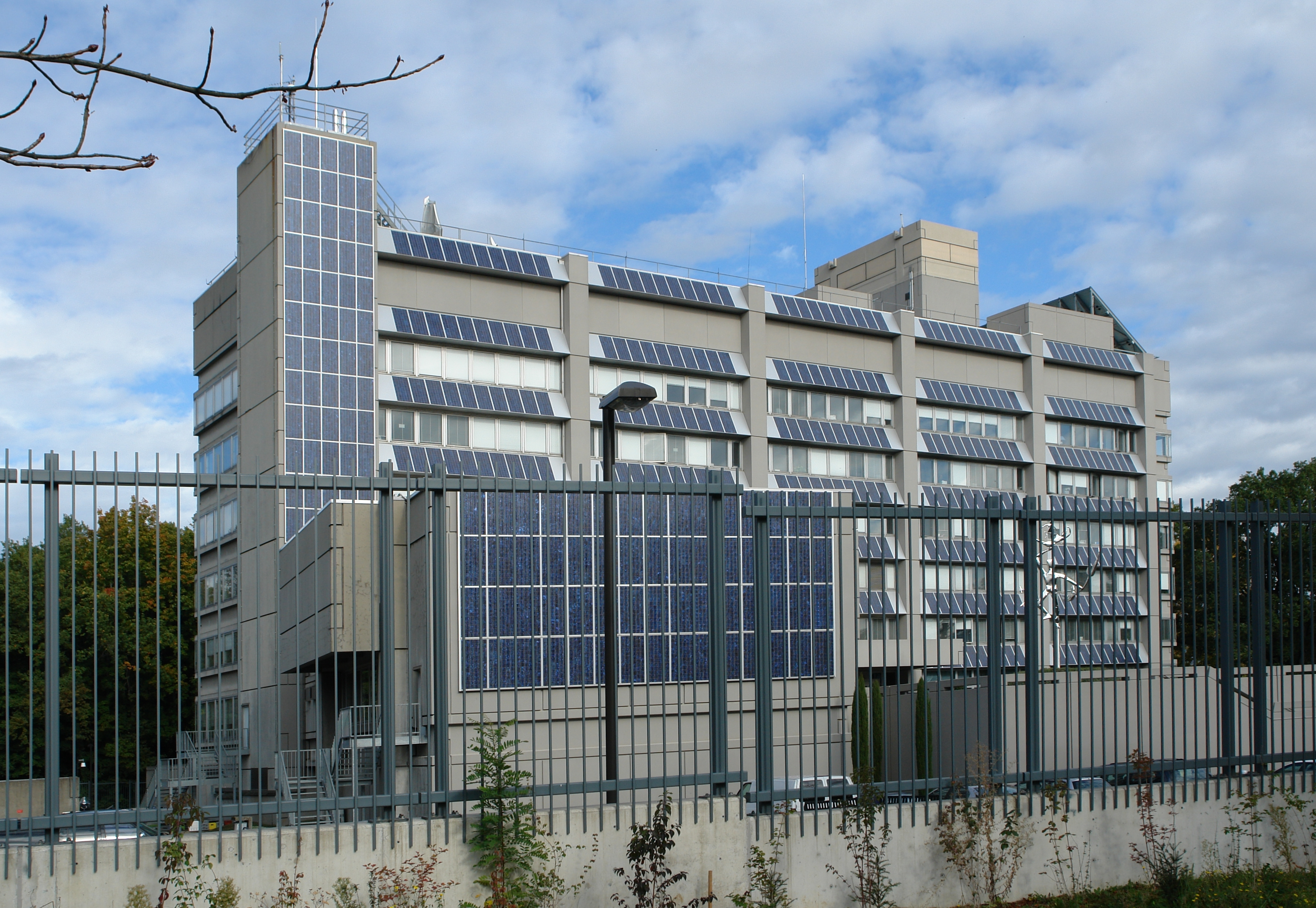
Consular Agency and Permanent Mission of the United States in Geneva

== See also ==
- Swiss Americans

== Sources ==
- Meier, Heinz K. (1963). The United States and Switzerland in the Nineteenth Century. Studies in American History. Vol. I. The Hague: Mouton & Co.
