= Carl Bruggmann =

Swiss attorney and diplomat (1889–1967)

His Excellency Carl Bruggmann

Minister of Mission of Switzerland to the United States
- In office 1939–1954
- President: Philipp Etter
- Preceded by: Marc Peter
- Succeeded by: Henry de Torrenté

Personal details
- Born: Karl Leo Bruggmann; 3 August 1889 Lichtensteig, Switzerland
- Died: 16 September 1967 (aged 78) Vevey, Switzerland
- Spouse: Mary Olive Wallace (m. 1924)
- Relations: Henry Cantwell Wallace (father-in-law); Henry A. Wallace (brother-in-law)
- Children: 2
- Education: University of Strasbourg; University of Heidelberg; University of Berlin; University of Bern

Karl Leo Bruggmann colloquially Carl Bruggmann (3 April 1889 – 16 September 1967) also occasionally Charles Bruggmann was a Swiss attorney and diplomat who most notably served as Minister of Switzerland to the United States from 1939 to 1954.

== Early life and education ==
Bruggmann was born 3 April 1889 in Lichtensteig, Switzerland, to Johannes Bruggmann, an affluent farmer, and Eugenie Nanette Bruggmann, into a Protestant family. He had two older siblings.

After attending the local schools he studied law at the Universities of Strasbourg, Heidelberg, Berlin and Bern completing his Juris Doctor in 1912. The same year his mother passed away.

== Career ==
Bruggmann initially worked as an attorney in St. Gallen and Geneva upon entering the diplomatic service in 1917. First postings included Saint Petersburg, Brussels, Washington and Paris. He served as Minister to Prague before being posted to Washington, D.C., where he held the position of Swiss Minister to the United States from 1939 to 1954.

== Personal life ==
In 1924, Bruggmann married Mary Olive Wallace (1898–1987), a daughter of Henry Cantwell Wallace and Carrie May Wallace (née Brodhead; 1867–1948), of Ulster Scots, English and Dutch stock. Her father served as the 7th United States Secretary of Agriculture from 1921 to 1924. Her brother, Henry A. Wallace, also served that role and ultimately became the 33rd Vice President of the United States in the Roosevelt Administration. They had two sons;

- Charles Henry Bruggmann (1927–2013), an attorney and diplomat who served as Ambassador of Switzerland to South Africa (1978–1984), Denmark (1984–1987) and Brazil (1987–1991), married with issue.
- Willi B. Bruggmann (1931–1986)

Bruggmann passed away 3 August 1967 at his estate, Domaine de Chapponeyres, in Vevey, Switzerland aged 78.
