= Hans A. Sulzer =

Swiss industrialist (1876–1959)

His Excellency Hans A. Sulzer
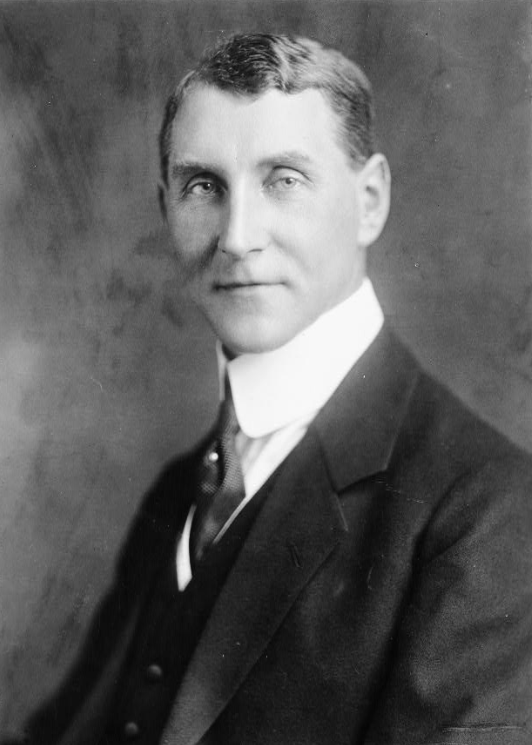
- Hans A. Sulzer, c. 1917 by Harris & Ewing, Washington, D.C.

Minister of Mission of Switzerland to the United States
- In office 30 May 1917 – 1 January 1919
- President: Arthur Hoffmann
- Preceded by: Paul Ritter
- Succeeded by: Marc Peter

Personal details
- Born: Hans Adolf Sulzer; 17 March 1876 Winterthur, Switzerland
- Died: 3 January 1959 (aged 82) Winterthur, Switzerland
- Spouse: Elisabeth "Lili" Weber (m. 1906)
- Children: 3
- Education: University of Geneva; Humboldt University of Berlin; University of Leipzig
- Occupation: Industrialist; economic representative; diplomat

Hans Adolf Sulzer (Swiss Standard German pronunciation: [ˈsʊltsər]; 17 March 1876 – 3 January 1959) was a Swiss industrialist, economic representative and diplomat who served as Minister to the Mission of Switzerland to the United States in Washington, D.C., from 1917 to 1919. He was the president and chairman of Sulzer Brothers for several decades.

The New York Herald Tribune titled him "business-statesman" shortly before his death. Sulzer was among the most influential business pioneers of Switzerland at the time.

== Early life and education ==
Sulzer was born 17 March 1876 in Winterthur, the youngest of six children, to J. Heinrich Sulzer (1837-1906) and Bertha Louise Sulzer (née Steiner; 1841-1927). He was part of the third generation of the Sulzer family co-founded by his grandfather Johann Jakob Sulzer. His brothers, Carl and Robert would also enter the family business. His sister, Jenny Sulzer, would marry Sidney Brown.

Sulzer studied Law and Economics at the Universities of Geneva, Berlin and Leipzig graduating with a Juris Doctor in 1900. Shortly thereafter, in 1903, he entered Sulzer Brothers.

== Diplomatic career ==
Sulzer was a non-career diplomat and has been appointed as Minister to the Mission of Switzerland in the United States from 30 May 1917 to 1 January 1919.

== Personal life ==
In 1906, he married Elisabeth "Lili" Weber, a daughter of Johann Jakob Weber and Elisabetha Weber (née Imhoof). The brides grandfather, Johann Jakob Weber Sr. (1814–1901), was a textile manufacturer (dyeing works "zur Schleife") and Cantonal Councilor. They had three children:

- John R. Sulzer (1907–1990), married American-born Mary Christine Knowlton, both of Locust Valley, New York.
- Georg "Gög" Sulzer (1909–2001), married Swiss American Lieselotte Schwarzenbach (1913–1981), of the Schwarzenbach family, one son; Peter-Georg Sulzer (born 1944), formerly head of Sulzer International division and once BoD of UBS.
- Alfred Edward Sulzer (1914–1987), married Dorette Merian (1917–2008)

Sulzer died in Winterthur aged 82.

== Literature ==
- Daniel Nerlich, Matthias Wiesmann (Hg.); Weltengänger in krisenhaften Zeiten; Chronos Verlag; ISBN 978-3-0340-1730-5; 2023 (in German)
