= Swiss Agency for Development and Cooperation =

Coordinates: 46.9463°N 7.4426°E

- (in German) Direktion für Entwicklung und Zusammenarbeit (in French) Direction du développement et de la coopération (in Italian) Direzione dello sviluppo e della cooperazione (in Romansh) Direcziun da svilup e da cooperaziun

Agency overview
- Jurisdiction: Federal administration of Switzerland
- Headquarters: Bern
- Employees: Patricia Danzi (Director General)
- Minister responsible: Ignazio Cassis, Federal Councillor
- Parent agency: Federal Department of Foreign Affairs
- Website: www.deza.admin.ch

The Swiss Agency for Development and Cooperation (SDC) (Note: German: Direktion für Entwicklung und Zusammenarbeit, French: Direction du développement et de la coopération, Italian: Direzione dello sviluppo e della cooperazione, Romansh: Direcziun da svilup e da cooperaziun) is an office-level agency in the federal administration of Switzerland, and a part of the Federal Department of Foreign Affairs. Together with other federal offices, SDC is responsible for overall coordination of Swiss international development activities and cooperation with Eastern Europe, as well as humanitarian aid.

According to the OECD, Switzerland's total official development assistance (ODA) increased in 2022 to USD 4.5 billion (preliminary data) due to an increase in in-donor refugee costs. This represented 0.56% of gross national income (GNI).

== History ==
The SDC has been active in Burkina Faso since 1974. In 1993, the SDC ran an office in Eritrea, which closed in 2006 when the SDC stopped supporting its projects in Eritrea for political reasons. The SDC relaunched its support actions in Eritrea in 2017 and terminated it in 2025, after no progress in the field of migration was made in negotiations with the Eritrean government.

In 2014, through a partnership with the Edmond de Rothschild Foundation and the École Polytechnique Fédérale de Lausanne, the SDC launched the Moocs for Africa program to improve science and technology education in French-speaking African countries.

On 13 December, 2019, Patricia Danzi was appointed new director general of the SDC. She assumed office on 1 May, 2020, succeeding Manuel Sager who had held it since 2014.

In April 2020, the SDC, which had already contributed CHF 101.42 million towards the global response to the COVID-19 pandemic, committed to provide an additional CHF 400 million. In December 2020, the SDC released a 4.35 million dollars support fund for the phase 2 of the UNFPA Women Girls First Programme in Myanmar, and invested 30 million dollars in Aceli Africa (loans to agricultural SMEs) along with the Ikea foundation and the USAID.

== Organisation and tasks ==
The Swiss constitution states that Switzerland contributes to the alleviation of hardship and poverty in the world, to respect for human rights, and to the promotion of democracy and the peaceful coexistence of nations. The SDC is charged with implementing this mission.

The SDC's activities are divided into three areas:

- In the context of bilateral and multilateral development cooperation, the SDC promotes economic and national self-sufficiency, works to improve conditions of production, assists in dealing with environmental problems and helps to ensure better access to education and healthcare for the poor. For example, SDC was a major donor to the International LUBILOSA Programme: which developed a biological pesticide for locust control, in support of small-holder farmers in the Sahel.
- The mission of the Confederation's agency for humanitarian aid is to save lives and alleviate suffering. During armed conflicts and following natural disasters, it provides help through the Swiss Humanitarian Aid Unit and supports humanitarian partner organisations such as the Red Cross.
- Cooperation with Eastern Europe assists the countries of Eastern Europe and the Commonwealth of Independent States (CIS) to make the transition to democracy and the market economy.

Swiss bilateral development assistance is as of 2008 focused on 17 priority countries in Africa, Asia and Latin America. Cooperation with Eastern Europe centres on ten countries in South-Eastern Europe and the CIS. At the multilateral level, the SDC works with UN agencies, the World Bank and regional development banks.

The SDC's specialist units are grouped in the Thematic and Technical Resources Department. They focus mainly on conflict prevention, good governance, social development, employment and income, natural resources and the environment.
