= August R. Lindt =

Swiss lawyer and diplomat (1905–2000)

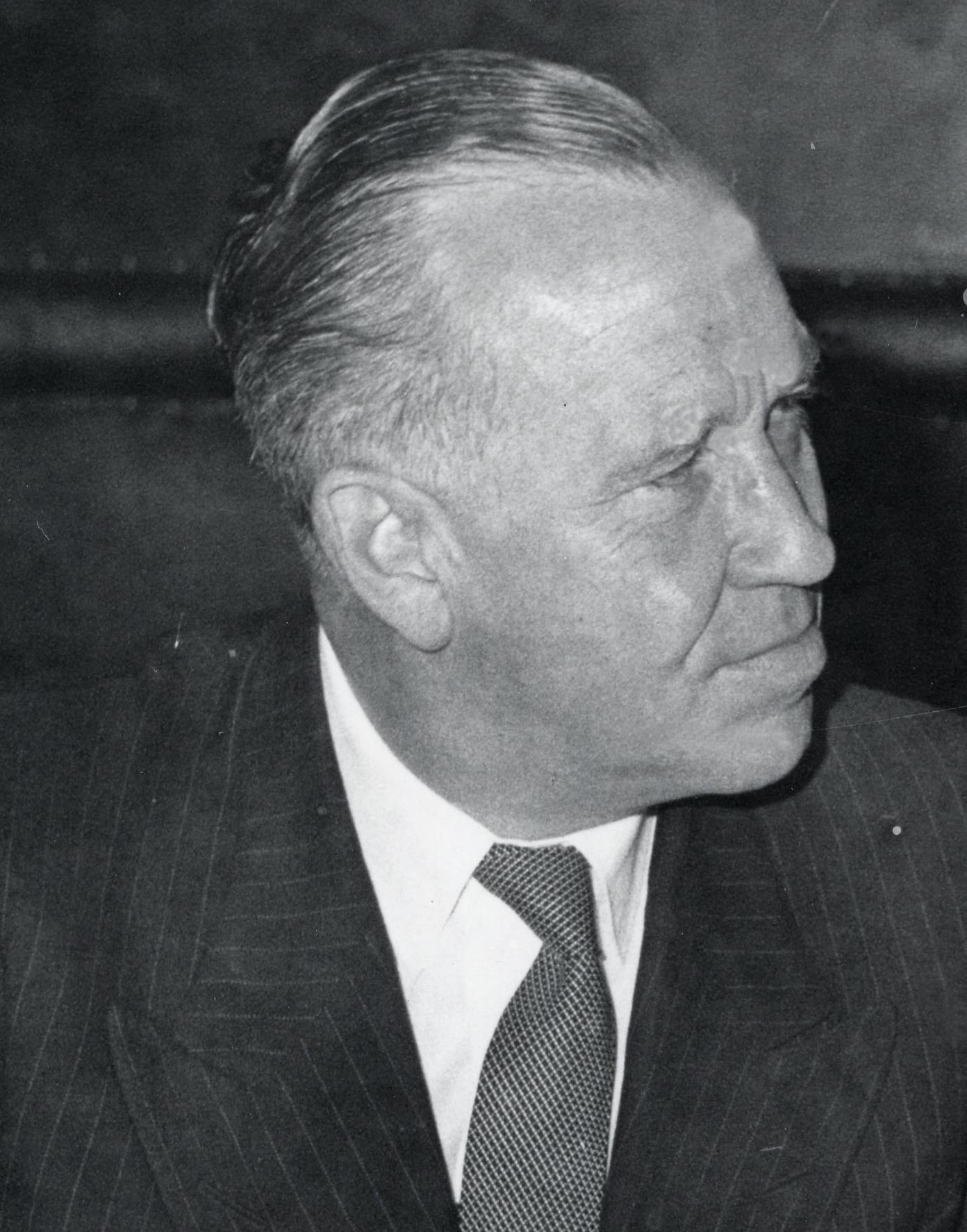
- Lindt in 1961

Chairman of UNICEF
- In office 1953–1954
- Preceded by: Adelaide Sinclair
- Succeeded by: Balachandra Rajan

United Nations High Commissioner for Refugees
- In office 1956–1960
- Preceded by: Gerrit Jan van Heuven Goedhart
- Succeeded by: Félix Schnyder

Personal details
- Born: 5 August 1905 Bern, Switzerland
- Died: 14 April 2000 (aged 94) Bern, Switzerland
- Spouses: Irma Marie Valerie Gärtner (m. 1931; div. 1932); Susanna Margaret Dunsterville (m. 1933; div. 1944); Ileana Maria Pociovălişteanu Bulova (m. 1962; div. 1965); Manjula Jaggia (m. 1969)
- Children: 3
- Profession: diplomat

August Rudolf Lindt (5 August 1905 – 14 April 2000) colloquially Auguste R. Lindt was a Swiss lawyer and diplomat who most notably served as Chairman of UNICEF in 1956 and as United Nations High Commissioner for Refugees from 1956 to 1960.

== Early life and education ==
Lindt was born 5 August 1905 in Bern, Switzerland, to August Ludwig Lindt (1867–1927), pharmacist and chocolate manufacturer, and Lina Mathilde Lindt (née Rüfenacht), into a Protestant family. He was a nephew of Rodolphe Lindt.

The Lindt family belonged to the Bernese bourgeoisie who acquired their place of origin there during the Restoration period in 1820. They were settled in Nidau since 1769 originally being from Windecken in the Landgraviate of Hesse-Kassel (presently Hesse, Germany). His father and a cousin who previously worked at Lindt & Sprüngli founded A. & W. Lindt in 1906, as a direct competitior, and were later sued for using the Lindt name in combination with chocolate, and in 1927 lost litigation in court and were ordered to pay 800,000 Swiss Francs (modern equivalent of approximately 5–6 million).

He completed his Matura in Bern and completed studies at the University of Geneva and the University of Bern from 1924 to 1927. He completed his Juris Doctor with the thesis Das sowjetrussische Aktienrecht (soviet corporate law).Later in life he received honorary doctorates from the Universities of Geneva and Wilmington, Delaware, United States.

== Professional career ==
Between 1928 and 1930, Lindt worked in banks in Paris and London, something he later said himself he was not at all suited, making numerous embarrassing mistakes and costing his employers dearly.

During Lindt's time in Paris, he met two Russian émigrés, André Galitzine and Boris Kaufman, and produced and financed their first film, an early social documentary short called Les Halles centralle (c. 1929). Kaufman went on to become a cinematographer who shot for Jean Vigo (L'Atalante) and helped introduce a neo-realistic style into American films, including On the Waterfront and 12 Angry Men. He won two Oscars.

== Journalism ==
Between 1932 and 1939, Lindt was based in London working as a foreign correspondent for Swiss, German and British newspapers. His work took him to Manchuria, Liberia, Palestine, Jordan, Saudi Arabia, Tunisia and Romania. During the winter of 1939–1940, he was a war correspondent with Finnish forces during the Russo-Finnish War. Lindt's experience of how a small population could resist a strong aggressor had a strong influence on his later advocacy of radical measures for Swiss resistance during the Second World War.

Whilst in England he met and married his second wife, Susannah Dunsterville, while she was a member of the Old Vic Theatre Company. The couple had three children.

== Second World War ==
Upon the outbreak of the Second World War Lindt joined the Swiss horse mounted cavalry as a corporal before in 1941 joining Swiss military intelligence for the rest of the war.

== Part in the Swiss Resistance Movement ==
=== Offiziersverschwörung (Officers' Conspiracy) ===
In 1940, following the fall of much of Europe, including France and the Netherlands, an ambiguous radio address by Swiss Federal President Marcel Pilet-Golaz was taken by many as signalling a potential weakening of the government and army's resolve in the face of what appeared to be an imminent Nazi invasion. This and other government broadcasts also appeared to reflect a growing impatience from conservatives with the slowness of the Swiss system and their desire for a more authoritarian style of government. Consequently, Corporal Lindt together with several officers gathered in secret and formulated a plan to, if necessary, take control of the army, ensuring it would continue to fight even if the government and the army leadership capitulated. They drew up a manifesto at the meeting which called for unconditional armed resistance and the renewal of Switzerland based on the following basic principles: military comradeship and discipline, the federal principle of democracy, the unconditional respect for the individual and the family, and the rejection of a totalitarian state.

However, whilst arranging a follow-up meeting, news of the Offiziersverschwörung and its intentions accidentally got out, and several members were arrested and imprisoned, initially suspected of being part of a defeatist organization and for high treason. Lindt, who had escaped arrest, made a direct appeal on the group's behalf to politician Hans Oprecht and through him to General Guisan, the commander of the Swiss army. He informed them of the group's true motivations and objectives. This directly led to the prisoners' sentences being reduced, and ultimately all were pardoned and reinstated to their previous positions. In an extraordinary final move, members of the group were given direct unfettered access to General Guisan, in spite of repeated calls for their dismissal from the Federal President Pilet-Golaz. As the officers' objectives were broadly in line with the majority of political and civilian opinion at the time, it has been questioned by historian Willi Gautschi whether the term coup as an objective of the group is really appropriate. Many members, including Lindt, continued to form and be part of other secret resistance groups protecting the principal of Switzerland's armed-neutrality, such as the Aktion Nationaler Widerstand.

=== Heer und Haus (Army and Home) ===
From 1941 to the end of the war, Lindt was head of the Civil Reconnaissance Service in the Heer und Haus division of the Swiss Army Command. Heer und Haus was conceived by intelligence operative Hans Hausamann and Lindt, using his background in journalism. The division was Switzerland's most important tool in building and strengthening the morale to defend and resist among the Swiss army and civilian population. It did this by developing and maintaining the bond of Swissness across a nation which included a German-speaking majority in the face of Aryan propaganda and Nazi aggression. Heer und Haus provided entertainment and sporting activities for soldiers and shows and festivals for civilians. Most importantly, there were weekly public lectures on the war, including the current military situation and the ongoing will to fight. Lecturers stated clearly that Hitler was the enemy and left people who attended the lectures to spread the word. In this way, an entire communications network pervaded the country completely free of the national press censorship. This was done in the full knowledge that anything written or published would be seized on by the Germans as a violation of Swiss-declared neutrality and justification in their eyes for an invasion.

Immediately after the war, Lindt made his first move into humanitarian work. He took part in organizing the Swiss donation for the benefit of shattered Europe and went to a devastated Berlin as a delegate for the International Red Cross (ICRC) to set up the committee's activities in the Soviet occupation zone.

In 1946 Lindt was appointed press and culture attaché posted to the Swiss embassy in London.

== Work for the United Nations and the UNHCR ==
From 1953 to 1956, Lindt was the Swiss Permanent Observer to the United Nations in New York. During this time he was Chairman of UNICEF and President of the United Nations Opium Conference.

In 1956 Lindt led the Swiss delegation for the International Atomic Energy Agency.

In 1956 he was appointed as the United Nations High Commissioner for Refugees (UNHCR), the second person to hold the office after Gerrit Jan van Heuven Goedhart, and served until 1960.

In his time as High Commissioner, Lindt and his office faced several international refugee crises, including large scale exoduses caused by the Hungarian Uprising in the first few months in his post and the ongoing Algerian War. These emerged alongside the High Commission's principal objective of resettling the 70,000 displaced people still living in 200 refugee camps across Europe following the war. Twenty-five per cent of the population of these Camps of Misery were children under 14. In addition to the camps in Europe, there were tens of thousands more people displaced as a result of the war in China and the Middle East. This was the most serious and embarrassing residual social and humanitarian problem of the Second World War. The worldwide publicity given the Hungarians drew international attention to the shameful conditions these stateless people were living.

In 1957 the General Assembly formally gave the UNHCR and Lindt a wider and more flexible role to address existing 'old' refugee problems but also 'new' current ones, and no longer just in Europe but worldwide. Finally, they gave his office due for redundancy the following year another five years.

The international satisfaction at the UNHCR and Lindt's pragmatic approach to the Hungarian crisis led to an outbreak of goodwill which was built upon with the declaration of 1959–1960 as United Nations World Refugee Year. The Year sought to encourage UN member states to continue to focus on the refugee problem, make additional financial contributions and to develop further humanitarian solutions for refugee settlement. It began in June 1959 with 52 countries participating, increasing to 72 countries and 6 territories by the end of 1959. However, clearing Europe's Camps of Misery took longer than many, including Lindt, had hoped and was not fully achieved until the mid-sixties.

The UNHCR under Lindt also began to take greater responsibility for refugees in the developing world and to de facto widen the UNHCR's refugee definition. Consequently, it received more recognition and support from governments such as the United States and Soviet Union for the role it could play in providing solutions across the globe.

== Later career ==
Lindt served as the ambassador of Switzerland to the United States from 1960 to 1962 in Washington during the Kennedy administration. He was then ambassador to the Soviet Union from 1966 to 1969.

=== Nigerian-Biafra War ===
In 1968 Lindt was seconded by the Swiss government to the International Committee of the Red Cross (ICRC) following their request for him to act as their commissioner-general during the Nigerian-Biafra Civil War. As a consequence of his experience and effectiveness at the UNHCR, he was given full control and responsibility for all aid operations, acting fully independently yet in the name of the ICRC. Initially deemed a great success including delivering nightly flights of relief supplies, ultimately there was culture clash between Lindt and the agency. ICRC felt Lindt excluded them from important decision making and was sometimes too radical in his methods, even driven by an obvious desire for effectiveness. His resolve to treat the Nigerian government and the Biafan authorities on an equal footing caused further widespread friction. Even though this and his strong enterprising personality was finally seen as being overall beneficial to the operation, it also contributed to an unfortunate hardening of the Nigerian government's attitude to the ICRC. As a result of this and other external factors, in the end, Lindt was arrested and expelled by the Nigerian government in 1969. The Nigerian discontent became focused on the personality of Lindt, described by some in the government as being too authoritarian and arrogant. This resulted in a lesson for the ICRC and other similar agencies which was the risk of associating an operation with a single individual. However, for Nigerian-Biafra the lesson came too late, and the ICRC were stripped of their role as operations controller in June 1969.

Upon his return to the Swiss Diplomatic Service Lindt was then appointed Swiss Ambassador to Mongolia, India and Nepal.

Between 1971 and 1977 Lindt was President of the Swiss international children's charity, known today as Enfants du Monde.

Lindt was an adviser to the President of Rwanda from 1972 to 1975.

== Personal life ==
In 1931, Lindt married firstly to Irma Marie Valerie Gärtner, with whom he had no children and divorced in 1932.

In 1933, he married secondly to Indian-born Susanna Margaret Dunsterville (1911–1992), a daughter of Lionel Charles Dunsterville, who served as a general in British India and Margaret Emily "Daisie" Dunsterville (née Keyworth). Dunsterville was a life-long friend of Rudyard Kipling and inspiration for the character of Stalky in Kipling's Stalky & Co. They had three children and were divorced in 1944.

In 1962, Lindt married thirdly to Ileana Maria Pociovălişteanu Bulova, the widow of Arde Bulova, was the founder and owner of the Bulova Watch Company. They were divorced in 1965.

In 1969, he married for a fourth and last time to Indian-born Manjula Jaggia.

Lindt passed away on 14 April 2000 in Bern, Switzerland aged 94.

== Literature ==
- Rolf Wilhelm (ed.): August R. Lindt: Patriot und Weltbürger. Haupt Verlag, Bern 2003, ISBN 978-3-258-06527-4.
