= Jacques Pitteloud =

Swiss diplomat (born 1962)

His Excellency Jacques Pitteloud
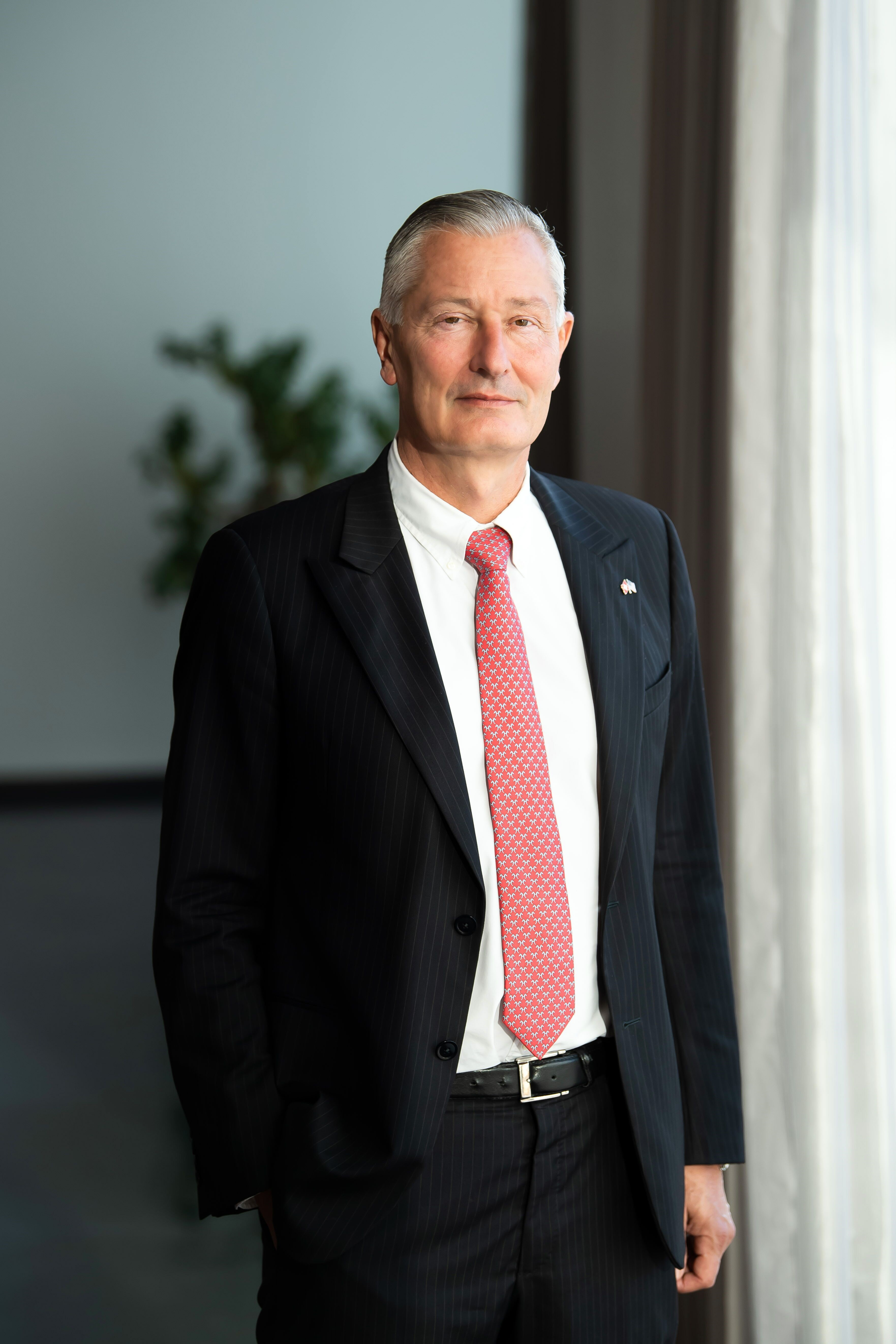
- Official portrait, 2019

Ambassador of Switzerland to the United States
- In office 16 September 2019 – 20 September 2024
- President: Ueli Maurer
- Preceded by: Martin Dahinden
- Succeeded by: Ralf Heckner

Personal details
- Born: Jacques Pitteloud; 12 November 1962 (age 63) Sierre, Switzerland
- Spouse: Angélique Gakoko
- Children: 1
- Education: University of Zurich
- Occupation: Diplomat, intelligence officer, foreign service officer
- Website: FDFA website

Jacques Pitteloud (French pronunciation: [ʒak pitəlu]; born 12 November 1962) is a Swiss diplomat and former head of the Swiss Intelligence Service (FIS). He served as the Ambassador of Switzerland to the United States from 2019 to 2024. He has previously served as Ambassador to Kenya, Uganda, Rwanda, Burundi, Somalia and the Seychelles from 2010 to 2015.

== Early life and education ==
Pitteloud was born 12 November 1962 in Sierre, Switzerland, to Jean-Jacques Pitteloud and Anne-Lise Pitteloud (née Galletti). His paternal grandfather, Cyrille Pitteloud, was a member of the Grand Council of Valais from 1917 to 1928. He studied law at the University of Zurich where he completed a Master's degree as well as a Doctorate in 1989. He also pursued post-graduate studies in security policy at the University of Geneva.

== Personal life ==
Pitteloud is married to Rwandan-born Angélique Pitteloud (née Gakoko), who belongs to the Tutsi ethnic group, whom he met during the Rwandan genocide in 1994, when he was assigned there. They have one daughter.

== See also ==
- List of speakers at The Economic Club of Washington, D.C.
