= Felix Schnyder =

Swiss jurist (1910–1992)

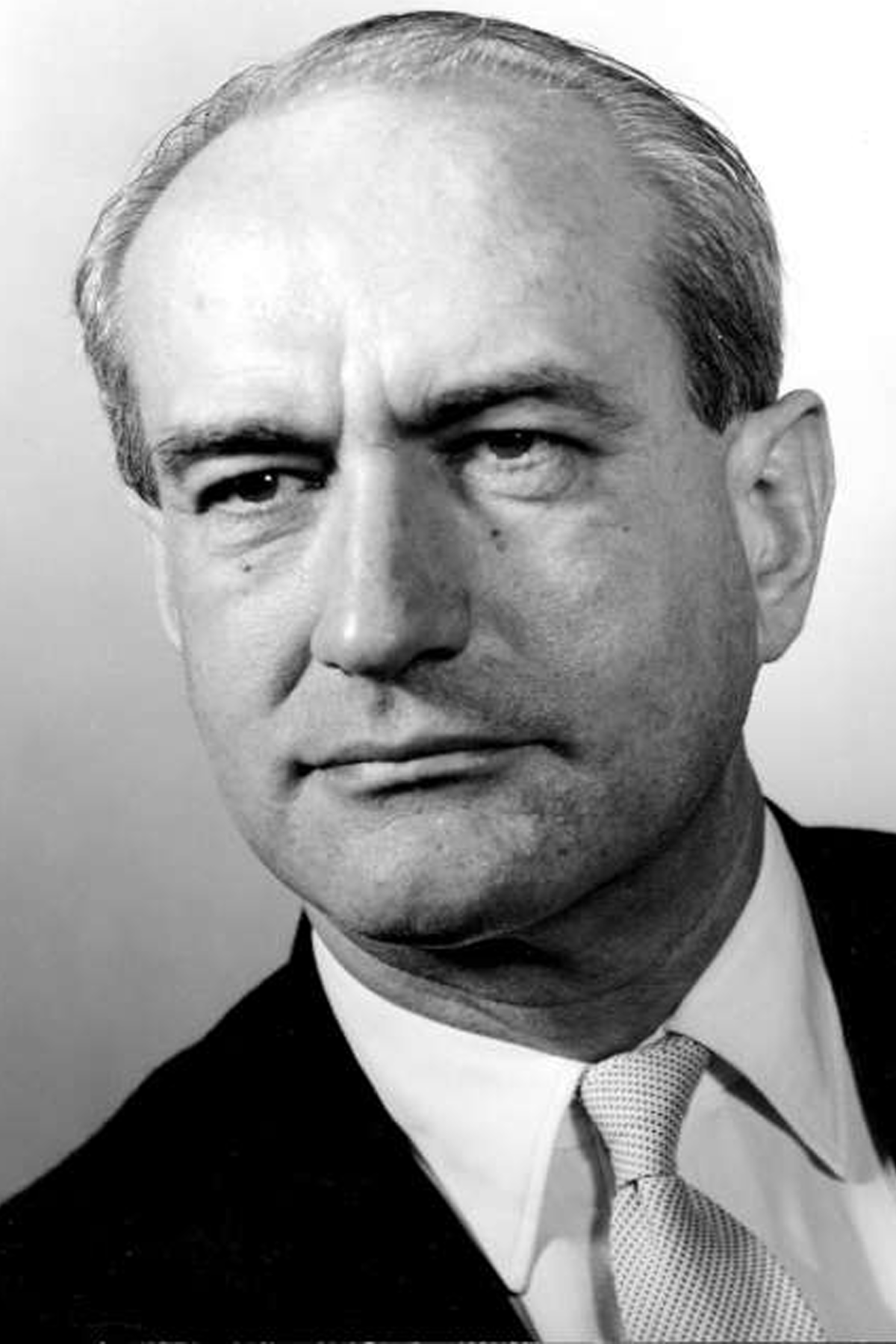

Chairman of UNICEF
- In office 1960–1960
- Preceded by: John Ryan
- Succeeded by: W. A. E. Green

United Nations High Commissioner for Refugees
- In office 1960–1965
- Preceded by: August R. Lindt
- Succeeded by: Sadruddin Aga Khan

Personal details
- Born: 5 March 1910
- Died: 8 November 1992 (aged 82)
- Profession: diplomat

Felix Schnyder (5 March 1910 – 8 November 1992) was a Swiss lawyer and diplomat. He was chairman of UNICEF in 1960, and United Nations High Commissioner for Refugees from 1960 to 1965.

== Career ==
Schnyder studied law and joined the Swiss diplomatic service in 1940. He was posted to Moscow, Berlin and Washington D.C. In 1958 he was appointed the Swiss Permanent Observer to the United Nations in New York. He was elected to the UNICEF Executive Board and was chairman in 1960. From 1960 to 1965 he was the third United Nations High Commissioner for Refugees, in succession to August R. Lindt.
