= Albert Heinrich Hürlimann =

Swiss industrialist (1857–1934)

- Born: Albert Heinrich Jakob Hürlimann; 28 June 1857; Feldbach, Switzerland
- Died: 2 April 1934 (aged 76); Zurich, Switzerland
- Occupations: Industrialist, brewing pioneer
- Known for: Leading Hürlimann Brewery
- Children: 7, including Martin

Albert Heinrich Hürlimann colloquially Heinrich Hürlimann (28 June 1857 – 2 April 1934) was a Swiss industrialist and pioneer of the brewing industry. He was the proprietor of the Hürlimann Brewery, one of the leading breweries in Switzerland at the time.

== Early life and education ==
Hürlimann was born 28 June 1857 in Feldbach, Switzerland (presently Hombrechtikon), one of two children, to Albert Heinrich Hürlimann (1828–1888), a brewer, and Elisabeth Hürlimann (née Müller; 1827–1911), into a prosperous Protestant family. He had a younger sister, Anna Hürlimann (1859–1915).

== Personal life ==
In 1887, Hürlimann married Anna Bertha Hirzel (1867–1949), later nicked "Queen Bertha", a daughter of Heinrich Salomon Hirzel, a silk dyer, and Elisabeth Henrietta Hirzel (née Wirz), of a noted Patrician family. They had seven children;

- Anna Bertha "Charlotte" Hürlimann (1888–1931), married Adolph Roniger (1880–1961), an heir to the Feldschlösschen Brewery in Rheinfelden, with whom she had three daughters.
- Alice Elisabeth Bertha Hürlimann (1889–1980), married Fritz Niggli (1875–1959), with issue.
- Albert Heinrich Hans Hürlimann (1891–1974), principal of the family business, married Gertrud Anna Huber (1897–1982), with issue.
- Heinrich Alexander Hürlimann (1893–1963), principal of the family business, married Erika Hofmann (1907–1994), with issue.
- Antoinette Lucie Hürlimann (1895–1896)
- Martin Axel Fritz Hürlimann (1897–1984), publisher and photographer, married German-born Bettina Kiepenheuer (1909–1983), three children including Regine Schindler.
- Anna Maria Esther Hürlimann (1903–1990), married Riccardo Jagmetti (1896–1964), with issue which included Riccardo Jagmetti (born 1929), a jurist and former politician who served on the Council of States (Switzerland), as well as Carlo Jagmetti (born 1932), also a jurist and former diplomat.

In 1897–1898, Hürlimann commissioned Villa Sihlberg, a Baroque style mansion, which was the primary residence of the family until the death of his grandson Martin Hürlimann in 2000. In 1933, Hürlimann was among the wealthiest Swiss citizens, with taxable wealth of over 16 million Swiss Francs (approximately 130–140 million Swiss Francs in modern equivalency).

Hürlimann passed away on 2 April 1934 aged 76.
