= Beer in Switzerland =

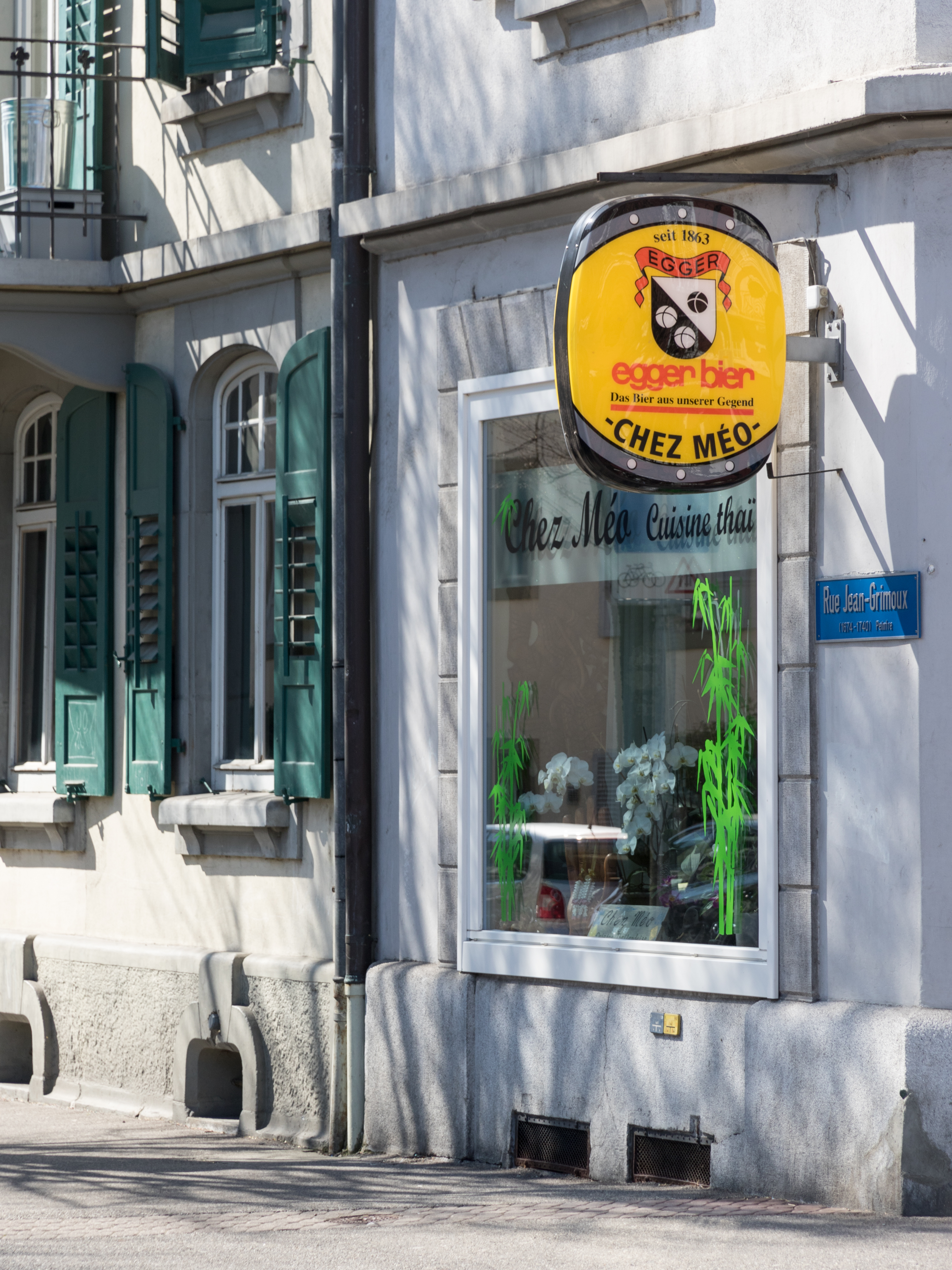
A restaurant sign advertising beer in Fribourg

Switzerland has a long tradition of brewing, with significant domestic beer production and a growing craft brewing sector.

Lagers are the most popular style, amounting to 72.2% of total beer consumption in 2020, with pale lagers being particularly popular. Switzerland ranks 33rd worldwide in annual per capita beer consumption as of 2019, behind most central European countries.

== History ==
Beer drinking in what would become Switzerland begins with La Tène culture: Gauls who thrived around 450 BCE to the 1st century BCE were known to make the drink, along with mead and wine.

The Plan of Saint Gall, an architectural drawing dating from the 9th century CE, depicts renovations for the monastery of Saint Gall with three breweries.

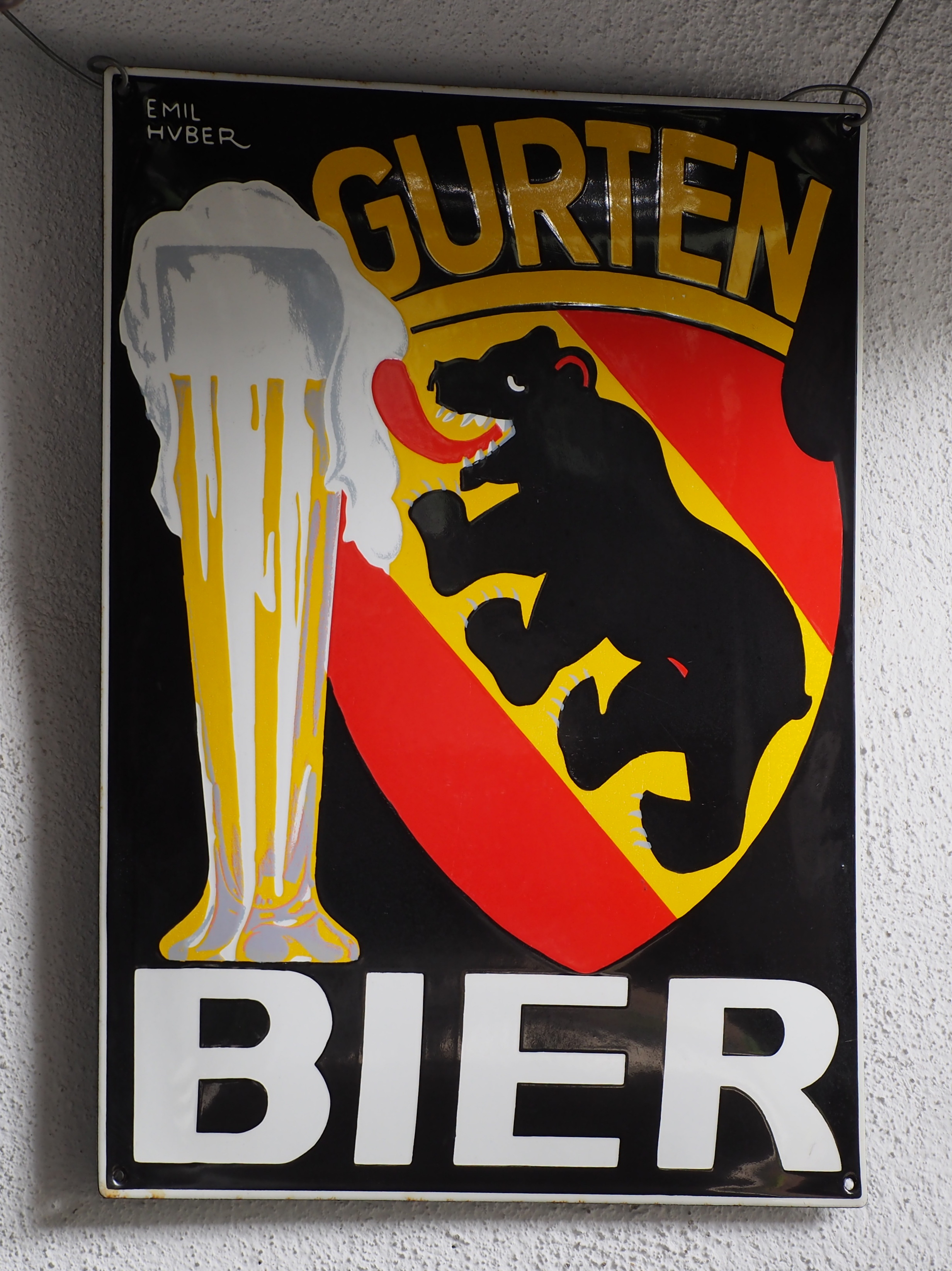
Gurten features a stylized Bern coat of arms in its advertising

Between 1935 and 1991, an agreement among nearly all Swiss brewers created a cartel in Switzerland. The cartel set beer prices and divided up the country into strict territories for each company. A consequence was stagnation in terms of innovation: because of the agreement on the types of beer produced, beer became a near-interchangeable good—brewers saw no need to distinguish themselves. The cartel's strict rules on distribution of beer meant little foreign beer was imported, despite the signing of free trade agreements with other European countries.

The cartel came to an end in the 1990s when the Cardinal, Feldschlösschen, and Hürlimann breweries left the agreement. Larger breweries began to buy smaller competitors, in turn attracting multinational brewing companies with experience in branding and marketing, who bought the large breweries in turn. However imported beer still comprised a modest market share of around 16% by the end of the 20th century.

Small-scale craft brewing experienced a boom in late 20th and early 21st centuries. The number of registered breweries grew from 81 in 2000 to over 1,000 in 2019.

== Swiss beer culture ==
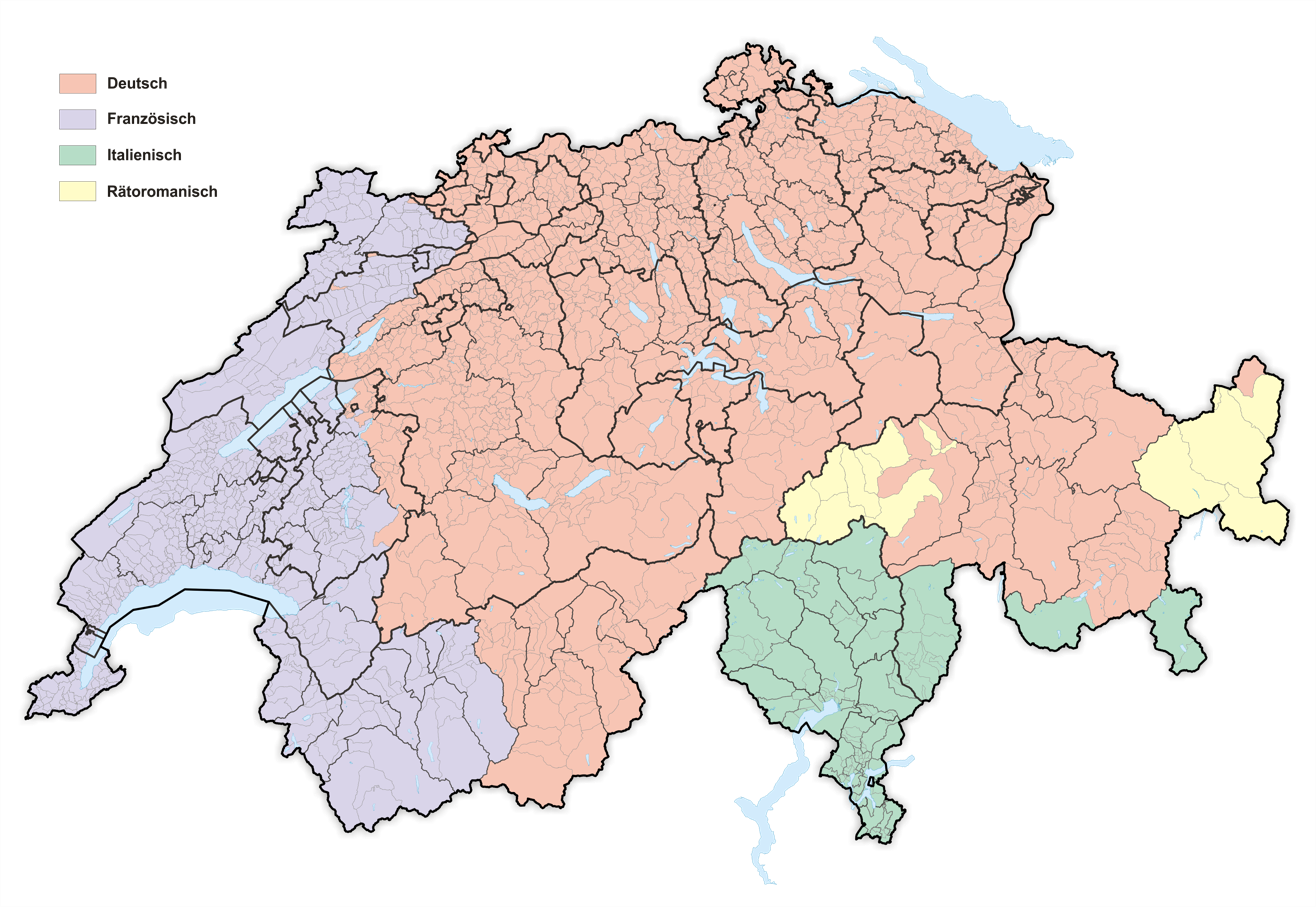
Switzerland's four national languages are spoken in the various regions (2026)

Switzerland has cultural differences between its linguistic regions, which may affect alcohol consumption trends. For example, one survey of 2,057 Swiss residents in 2015 found the French-speaking regions (also called Romandy) consumed less beer compared to German-speaking ones, while Italian-speaking Ticino was in between.

The French-speaking cantons of Geneva, Valais, and Vaud produce large volumes of wine, which has the advantage of being easily produced domestically from locally grown grapes. Brewing usually requires importing of malt and hops, from France and Germany. Larger breweries in Romandy include the Valaisanne brewery in Sion, and the former Cardinal brewery in Fribourg. Jura is home to the Brasserie des Franches-Montagnes, which has received international attention for its barrel-aged beers.

Most contemporary large-scale breweries are in German-speaking Switzerland. The Carlsberg-owned Feldschlösschen brewery in Rheinfelden dwarfs all others in the country in terms of output. Heineken owns the large Calanda brewery in Chur (in Graubünden, officially trilingual), and produces a number of different Swiss brands. Zürich hosts the country's largest beer festival annually, and has a number of microbreweries. German-speaking Switzerland produces wine as well, though not as much as Romandy.

Ticino has a number of smaller microbreweries, and also produces red wines in its warmer climate on the south side of the Alps.

Overall consumer preference tends towards milder beers, with the country being described in 2015 as "an island of light, non-offensive, lightly aromatic lager beers in Europe".

== Production today ==
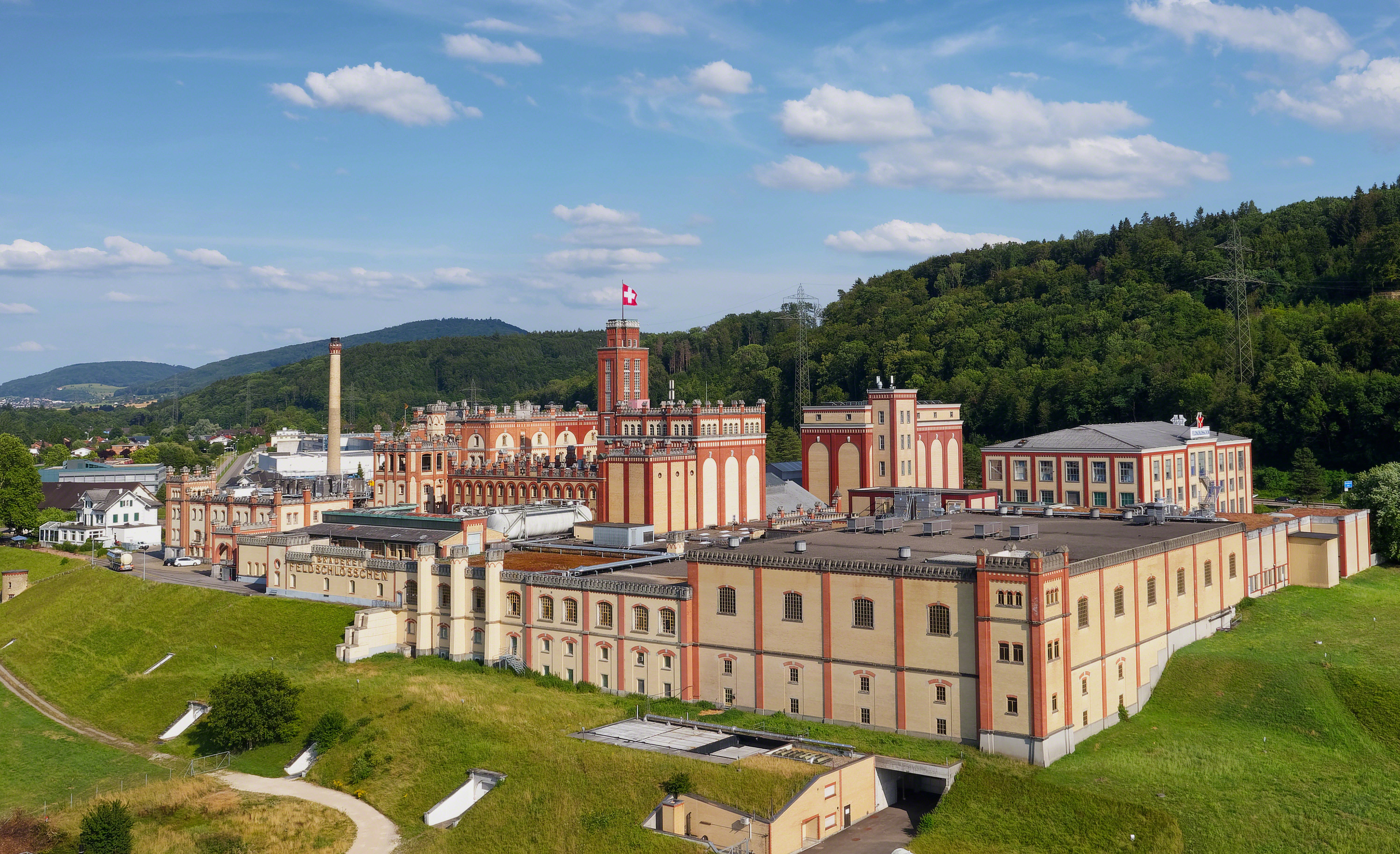
The Feldschlösschen brewery in Rheinfelden, Aargau, housed in a whimsical building. Feldschlösschen translates to "little castle in the field".

In 2019, beer accounted for 31.8% of the country's total alcohol consumption, compared to 49.4% for wine. Total production in 2019 was 3,675,000 hectolitres (80,800,000 imp gal), and total consumption of beer was 55.1 liters per capita

In the same year, Heineken (headquartered in the Netherlands) and Carlsberg (headquartered in Denmark), through their subsidiaries, controlled nearly 70% of the Swiss beer market.

Widely available beers include:

- Made by Carlsberg: Cardinal, Feldschlösschen, Gurten, Hürlimann, Valaisanne
- Made by Heineken: Calanda, Eichhof, Haldengut, Ittinger
- Independents: Appenzell, Brasserie des Franches-Montagnes, Schützengarten
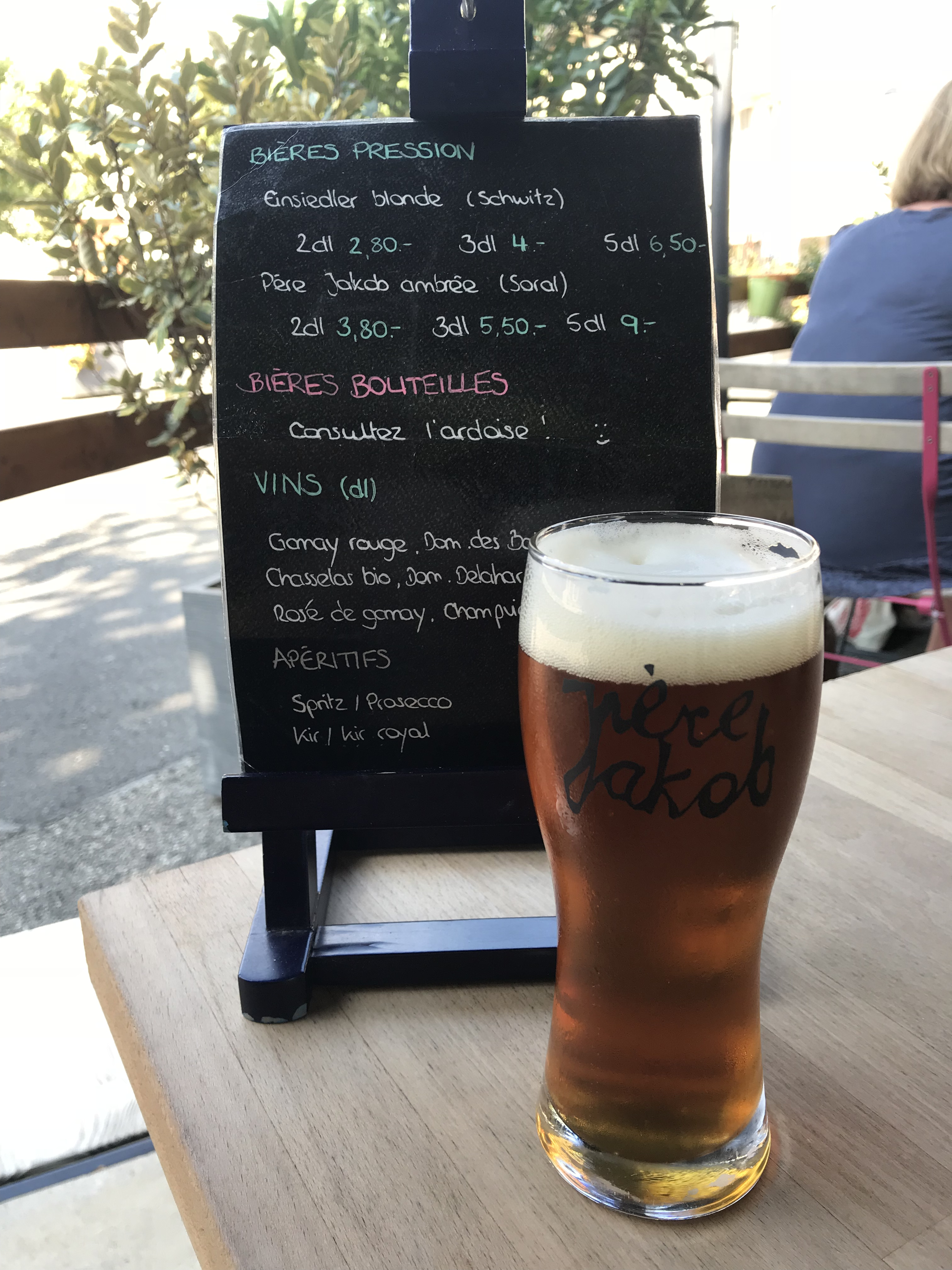
  Amber beer from a microbrewery in Soral, Geneva

== Regulation and taxation ==
Beer with alcohol above 1.2% abv is subject to the confederation's excise tax, and increases with alcohol content.

The age for purchase of beer is 16. Beer is widely available in outlets such as supermarkets (excepting the Migros chain), corner shops, and gas stations. However, the cantons regulate alcohol sales and are free to restrict sales as they see fit. Prices for beer in bars are high by international standards, but lower when purchased at supermarkets.
