= Ernst Wasmuth Verlag =

German publishing house, founded 1872

Ernst Wasmuth Verlag GmbH & Co.
- Founded: 1872
- Founder: Ernst Wasmuth
- Country of origin: Germany
- Headquarters location: Tübingen
- Distribution: Brockhaus Kommissionsgeschäft (Germany); Distributed Art Publishers (US); RIBA Book Distribution (UK)
- Publication types: Books
- Nonfiction topics: architecture, archaeology, art and design
- Official website: wasmuth-verlag.de

Ernst Wasmuth Verlag GmbH & Co. is a publisher based in Tübingen, in southern Germany. The themes of architecture, archaeology, art and design are the key topics of the publishing house, which was established in Berlin in 1872.

== History ==
On May 1, 1872 in Berlin, Ernst Wasmuth (1845-1897) opened a bookstore devoted to architecture, which he soon expanded into publishing. Some of the books he published became classics, including works by Hermann Muthesius and Frank Lloyd Wright. Early in the company history, Wasmuth began to publish two magazines, Der Städtebau (Urban development) and Architektur des XX. Jahrhunderts (Architecture of the 20th Century).

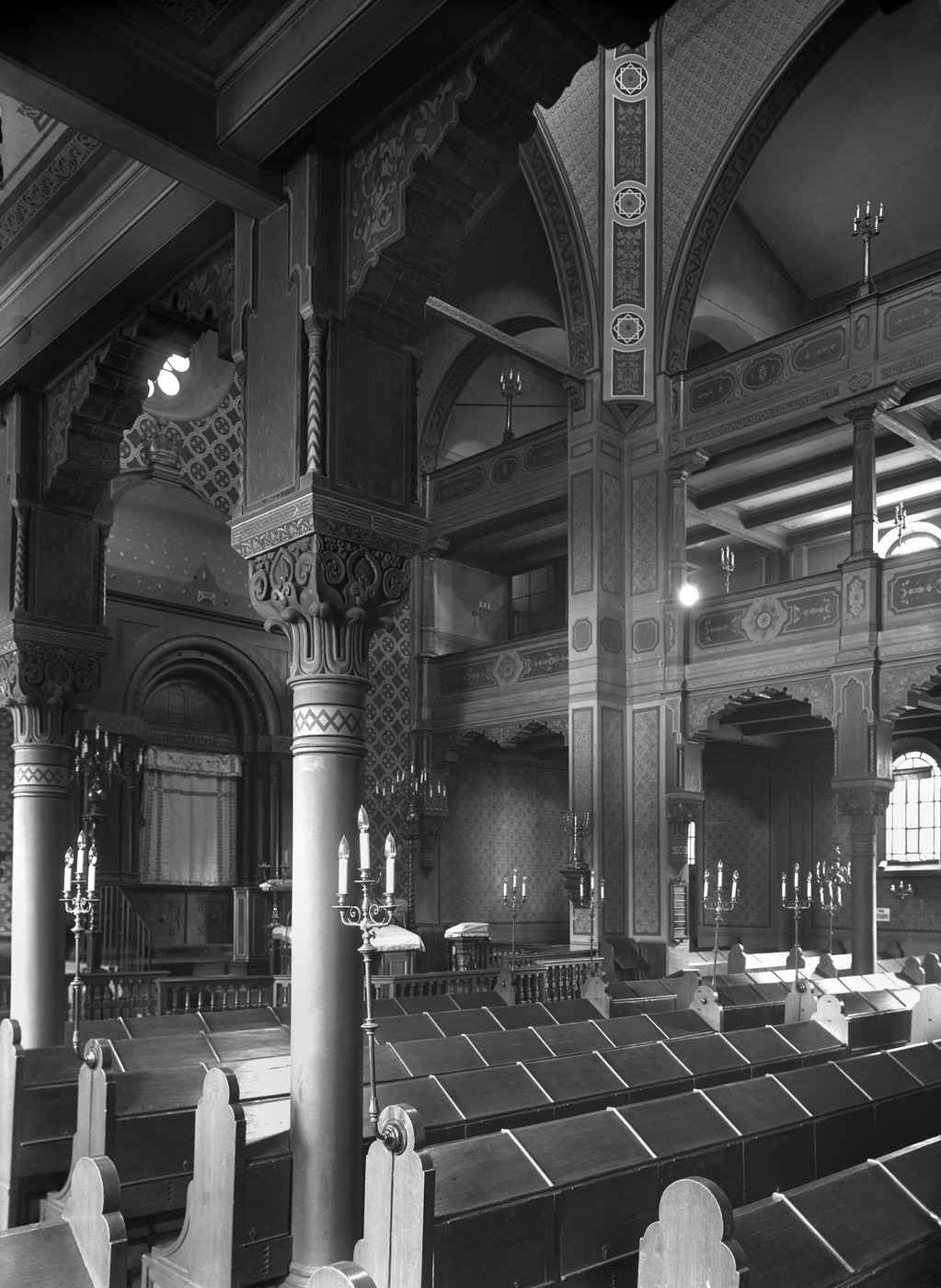
Wasmuth's periodical Architecture of the 20th Century is a valuable source of imagery for turn-of the century German architecture

In 1875, Ernst Wasmuth's younger brother, Emil, entered the business. He died in 1894. In 1905 the company began to publish Georg Dehio's Handbook of German Art History (Der Dehio), which was issued annually to 1928. From 1913 to 1943 Emil Wasmuth's son Günther ran the business in Berlin. Günther Wasmuth founded Wasmuth's Monatshefte für Baukunst (Monthly Architectural Bulletins) in 1914, edited by city planner and author, Werner Hegemann. From 1919 to 1926, Gunther's brother, Ewald Wasmuth, also worked at the company. He left publishing to focus on his own pursuits as a philosopher and translator of such writers as Blaise Pascal.

The publishing house was completely destroyed in an Allied bombing raid in 1943, including the company archive. After World War II, Günther Wasmuth re-established the business in Tübingen while a Wasmuth Antiquarian business was opened in Berlin. The publisher continued to focus on the fields of architecture, art and archaeology, to which it now added scientific works and illustrated books. Günther Wasmuth died in 1974. Ernst J. Wasmuth has been the managing director of the company since 1990.

In 1942, a branch of the company opened in Zürich under the name "Fretz & Wasmuth". The publisher produced books for the zones of occupation in Germany that could find no publisher at the time because their authors were discredited. That included, for example, the autobiography of Hans Bernd Gisevius, an avid leader of Nazi injustice, who later became a resistance member by his own account. The company prospects suffered in West Germany after 1945 to 1961 when new editions of earlier publications created larger readerships.

=== Wasmuth Portfolio ===
This was the American architect Frank Lloyd Wright's first publication anywhere in the world, as Wright had not published any of his work in his twenty previous years of activity in the United States. It contains plans and linework perspectives of buildings he designed between 1893 and 1909. It is thought that his book, published in German, had an influence on Dutch and German architects in the 1920s; a notable example is the work of the Modernist architect Willem Marinus Dudok.

=== Orbis Terrarum ===
Arguably one of its most enduring projects was its series of photo books published in the 1920s under the collective series name of Orbis Terrarum (The World). The company hired noted photographers to visit countries around the world and produced high quality reproductions of the finished products. The series was originally published in German (with German titles and introductory essays and with photo captions in English, French, German, Spanish and Italian). Many titles were later translated into English and French. The following list consists mostly of English language titles in this series and may be incomplete:

Title	Year of Publication	Photographer(s)	Notes
Architecture and landscape in China: A journey through twelve provinces	1923	Ernst Boerschmann	
Picturesque Great Britain: The Architecture and the Landscape	1926	Emil Otto Hoppé	Sold more than 100,000 copies.
Picturesque Mexico	1925	Hugo Brehme	An "expanded and refocused version" of Brehme's 1923 book of the same title. Also published in German, French and Spanish.
Canada: Landscape and Lives	1926	Various resident photographers, coordinated by E.O. Hoppé.	Text by Louis Hamilton
The Fifth Continent [Australia]	1931	Emil Otto Hoppé	"The first nationwide collective portrait of the young nation"
Yugoslavia (Selections)	1926	Kurt Hielscher	
Das Romantische Amerika	1927	Emil Otto Hoppé	Sold more than 100,000 copies. An important Modernist view of America. Published as Romantic America: Picturesque United States by B. Westermann Co.
Egypt: architecture, landscape, life of the people (Internet Archive)	1929	Herbert Ricke, Ludwig Borchardt, Alfred Buckham, Lehnert and Landrock and others	Text by Ludwig Borchardt and Herbert Ricke
Picturesque Greece: architecture, landscape, life of the people (Internet Archive)	1928	Hanns Holdt and others	Text by Hugo von Hofmannsthal
Germany	1925	Kurt Hielscher	Text by Gerhart Hauptmann
Italy (Selections)	1925	Kurt Hielscher	Text by Wilhelm von Bode
Scandinavia	1924	Valdemar Rordam, Ernst Klein and Theodor Caspari	
North Africa	1924	Lehnert and Landrock	
Picturesque Palestine, Arabia and Syria: The Country, The People and the Landscape (Wikimedia Commons)	1925	Karl Gröber	
India	1928	Martin Hürlimann	
France (Selections)	1927	Martin Hürlimann	Introduction by Paul Valéry
Indochina (Selections)	1929	Martin Hürlimann	
Austria	1928	Kurt Hielscher	
The unknown Spain. Architecture, landscape, people life	1922	Kurt Hielscher	

== Book series ==
- Bilderhefte des Deutschen Archäologischen Instituts Rom
- Das Deutsche Bürgerhaus
- Germanische Funde aus der Völkerwanderungszeit
- Historische Städtebilder
- Istanbuler Mitteilungen
- Islamische Kunst im Mittelmeerraum
- Kunstwissenschaftliche Schriften der Technischen Universität Berlin
- Orbis Pictus (or: Orbis Pictus / Weltkunst-Bücherei)
- Orbis Terrarum
- Römische Forschungen der Bibliotheca Hertziana
- Römisches Jahrbuch für Kunstgeschichte
- Sonderheften der Berliner Architekturwelt
- Tübinger Studien zur Archäologie und Kunstgeschichte
- Wasmuths Werkkunst-Bücherei

== Periodicals, journals ==
- Atlantis: Länder, Völker, Reisen
- Beiträge zur Bauwissenschaft
- Berliner Architekturwelt: Zeitschrift für Baukunst, Malerei, Plastik und Kunstgewerbe der Gegenwart
- Städtebau Monatshefte für Stadtbaukunst Städtisches Verkehrs- Park- und Siedlungswesen
- Wasmuths Kunsthefte
- Wasmuths Monatshefte für Baukunst

== Sources ==
- Eva-Maria Neubert: 100 Jahre Verlag Ernst Wasmuth, in: Börsenblatt für den Deutschen Buchhandel, Bd. 28, 1972, S. 819f.; mit 1 Faksimile
- N.N.: 125 Jahre Wasmuth. Katalog 9798 (= Teil der Bibliothek des Börsenvereins des Deutschen Buchhandels e.V.), darin: Firmenchronik, S. III-XIV, sowie Die wichtigsten Wasmuth-Publikationen von 1872 bis 1997, S. XV-XXVIII, Tübingen: Wasmuth, 1997.
- Roland Jaeger: Die Länder der Erde im Bild. Die Reihe Orbis Terrarum im Verlag Ernst Wasmuth, Berlin, und im Atlantis-Verlag, Berlin/Zürich. In: Manfred Heiting, Roland Jaeger (Hrsg.): Autopsie. Deutschsprachige Fotobücher 1918 bis 1945. Band 1. Steidl, Göttingen 2012, S. 98–131.
