= Lehnert & Landrock =

German-Bohemian photography duo

Lehnert & Landrock was a photographic studio run by Rudolf Franz Lehnert and Ernst Heinrich Landrock active in Tunisia and Egypt in the early 20th century, noted for producing Orientalist images. Rudolf Franz Lehnert and Ernst Heinrich Landrock produced images of North African people, landscapes, and architecture for a primarily European audience. These images were mainly distributed in monographs, though also as original prints, photogravures, and lithographic postcards.

== Background ==
Rudolf Franz Lehnert (13 July 1878 – 16 January 1948) was born in Gross Aupa, Bohemia (now Velká Úpa, Czech Republic), and Ernst Heinrich Landrock (4 August 1878 – 30 April 1966) in Reinsdorf, Saxony, Germany. Lehnert was raised by his uncle in Vienna and studied photography at the Vienna Institute of Graphic Arts. After finishing his studies he used money inherited from his parents to travel abroad with his camera and in 1903 made his first trip to Tunisia. In 1904, on his return to Europe, Lehnert met Landrock, who was studying in Switzerland, and the two decided to become business partners, founding the firm Lehnert & Landrock, with Lehnert taking the photographs and Landrock being the business administrator. They travelled to Tunisia in 1904 and opened a photography shop in Avenue de France, Tunis that Lehnert used as a base for his various photographic expeditions in the Maghreb while Landrock organised the photo laboratory, and the marketing of the resultant prints and postcards.

At the beginning of WW1, the shop was closed when martial law was declared in French colonies and, on 4 August 1914, Lehnert was arrested, made a prisoner of war and sent to an internment camp in Corsica, while Landrock was held in Switzerland. After the war, and following the return of their confiscated glass plates, they initially set up a business in Leipzig. Before long Lehnert was on the move again, travelling to the Middle East; Egypt, Palestine and Lebanon. In 1924 the partners moved to Cairo setting up a similar business to the one in Tunis but branching out "into the entire photo gamut - postcards, larger-sized photos, greeting cards and fine art prints" for the European market particularly pandering to the cult of orientalism and the popularity of postcards. In 1930 the partnership was dissolved when Lehnert moved back to Tunis, and opened a studio as a portrait photographer,. Landrock continued to run the studio and shop in Sherif Street, Cairo until the outbreak of WW2, when he returned to Germany in 1938. At that time, Kurt Lambelet, Landrock's stepson, took over the business turning it into a large book shop in the 1950s. The family run shop still remains at its original location.

== Legacy ==
In 1982, Dr Edward Lambelet, who had joined his father Kurt in the business, discovered the glass plate negatives of Lehnert and Landrock which were catalogued and printed, immediately becoming popular again. As Joseph Geraci states in his 2003 article 'Lehnert and Landrock of North Africa' for the journal History of Photography, in which he investigates the "subset of the Lehnert & Landrock oeuvre, a series of figure studies of North African people made by Lehnert from 1904 to 1914, and again from 1930 to 1939, as a method of exploring East-West interactions and imaginings", there was renewed interest in their work by both scholars and collectors in the 1980s. Wikimedia Commons has a large number of images under the category 'Lehnert & Landrock' that includes a subcategory 'Orientalist nude photographs by Lehnert & Landrock'. Whilst the landscape photographs are considered "the most ubiquitous surviving Orientalist imagery of North Africa in the early 20th century....that present a highly idealised vision of romantic Orientalism", the often eroticised images of nude or partially nude women and children are more controversial.

The renewed interest in the photographs resulted in a number of publications, the first being Lehnert & Landrock : L'orient d'un Photographe in 1987 by Philippe Cardinal followed by others, for example, Tunis 1900 - Lehnert & Landrock photographes by Michel Meguin, and a number of exhibitions of their work. Photographs by Lehnert & Landrock are also held in the undermentioned collections -;

- British Museum, London
- Conway Library, The Courtauld Institute of Art, London
- J. Paul Getty Museum, Los Angeles
- Library of Congress, Washington, DC
- University of Pennsylvania Museum of Archaeology and Anthropology, Philadelphia
- Royal Academy of Arts, London
- The Science Museum, London
- Victoria and Albert Museum, London

== Gallery ==
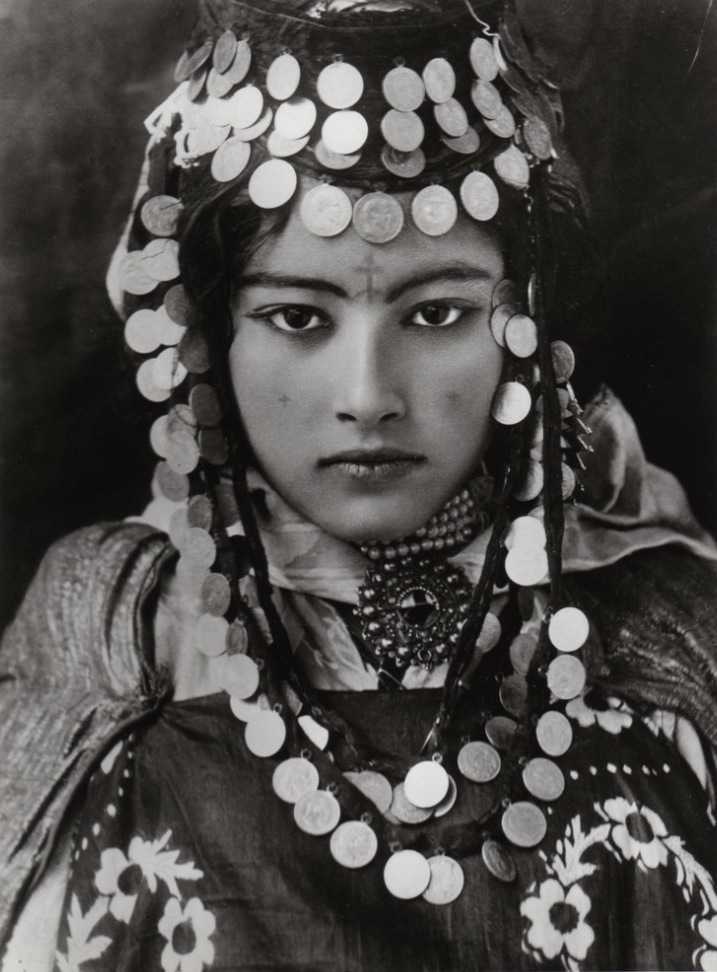
Ouled Naïl girl, Algeria

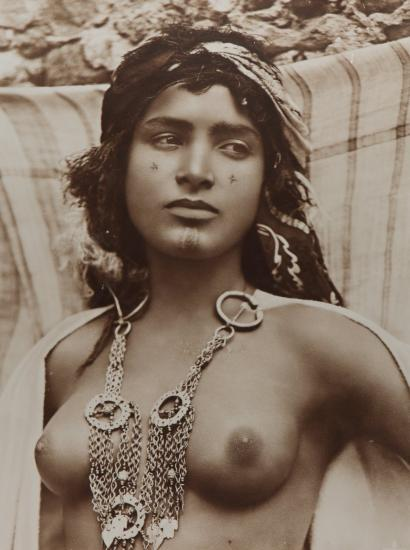
Ouled Naïl girl, Tunis

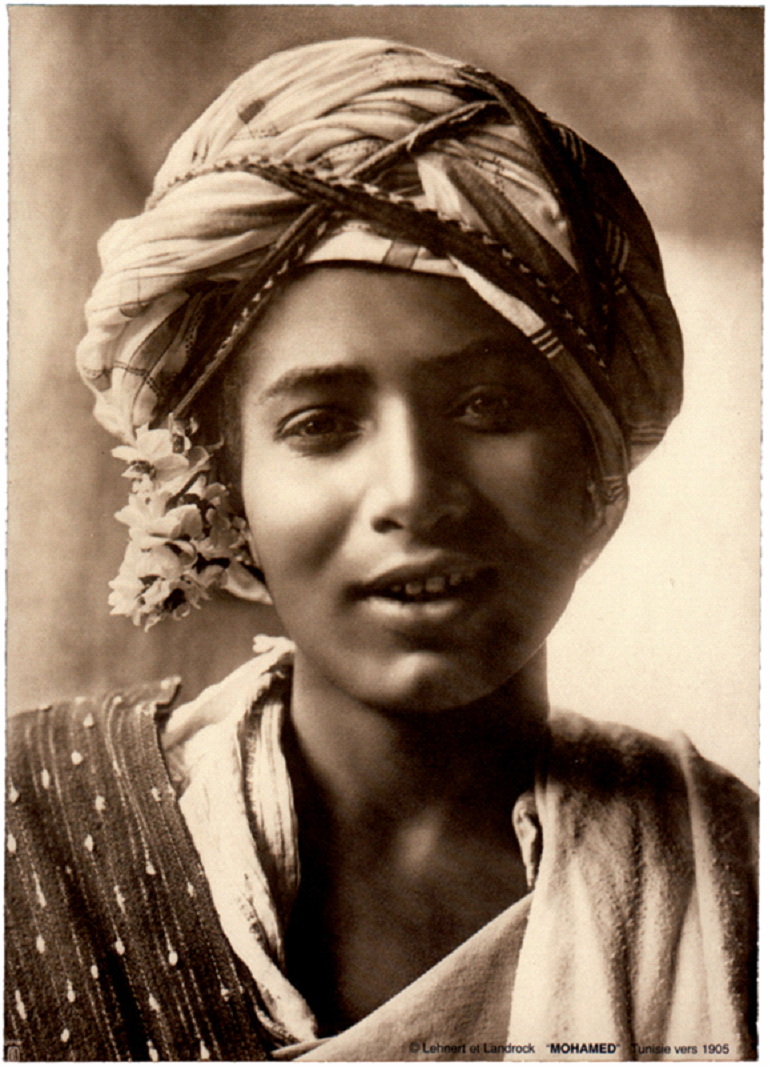
Arab youth

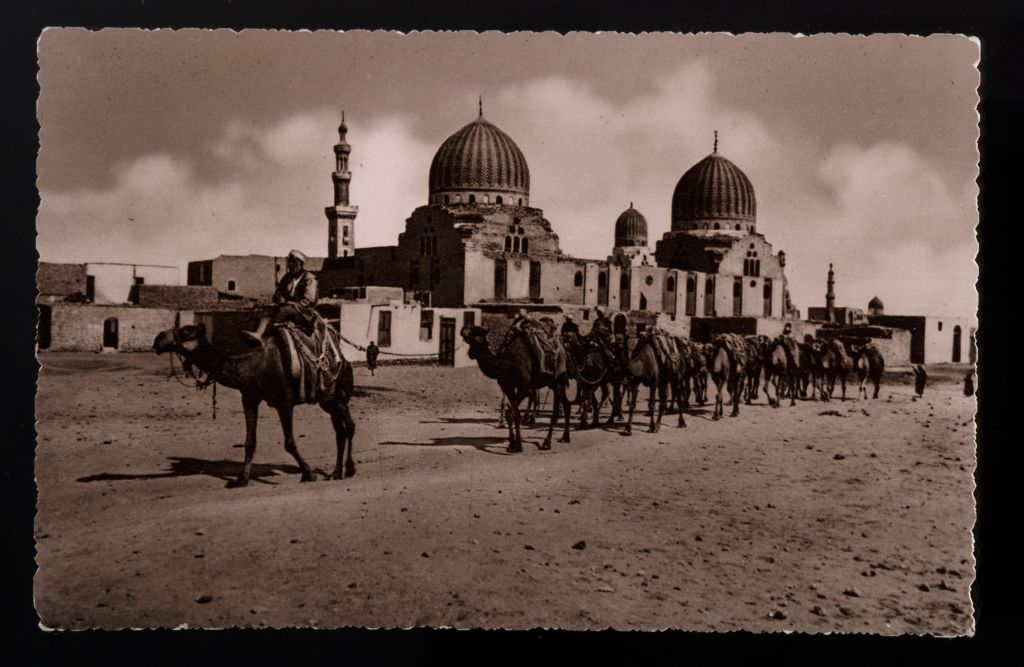
Camel train in front of the Sultan Barkouk Mosque, Cairo

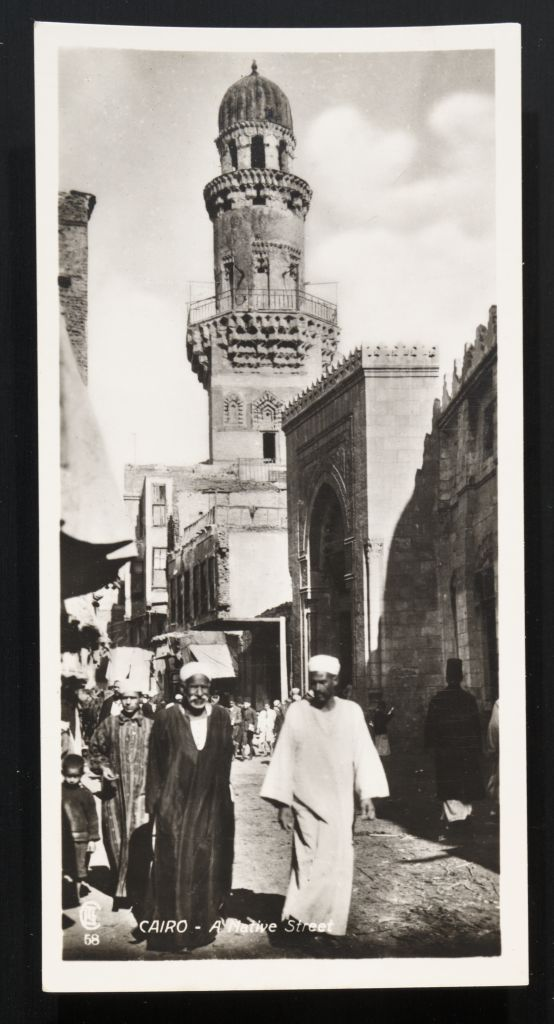
Street in Cairo

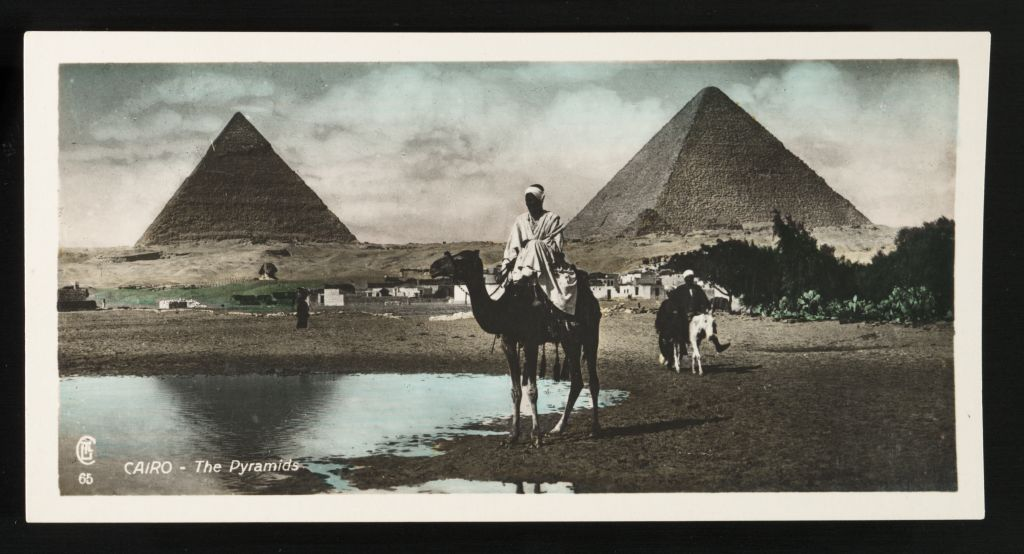
The Pyramids

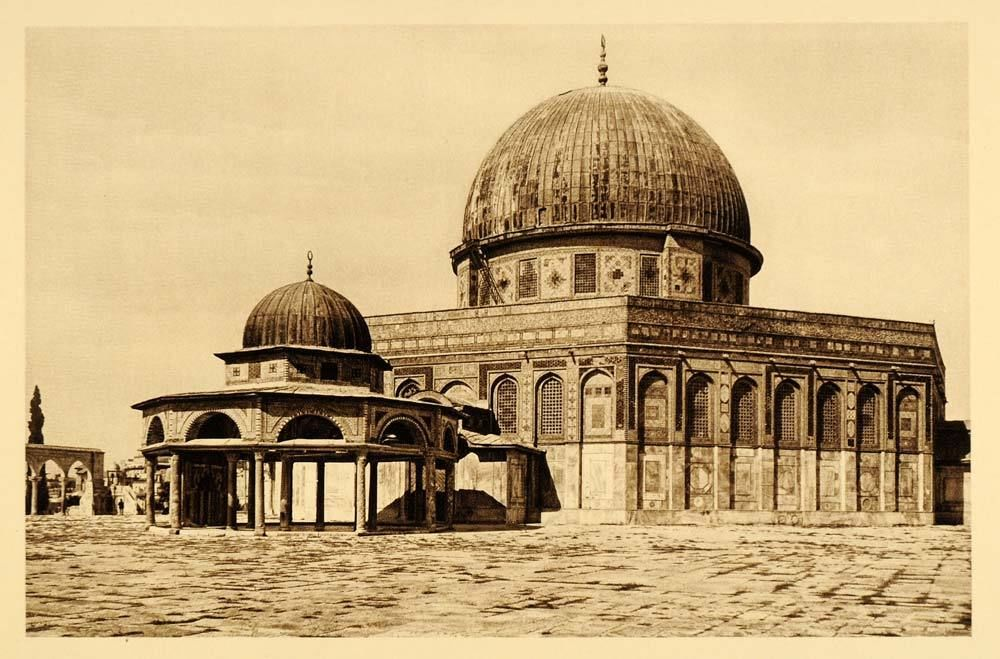
Jerusalem, Dome Rock

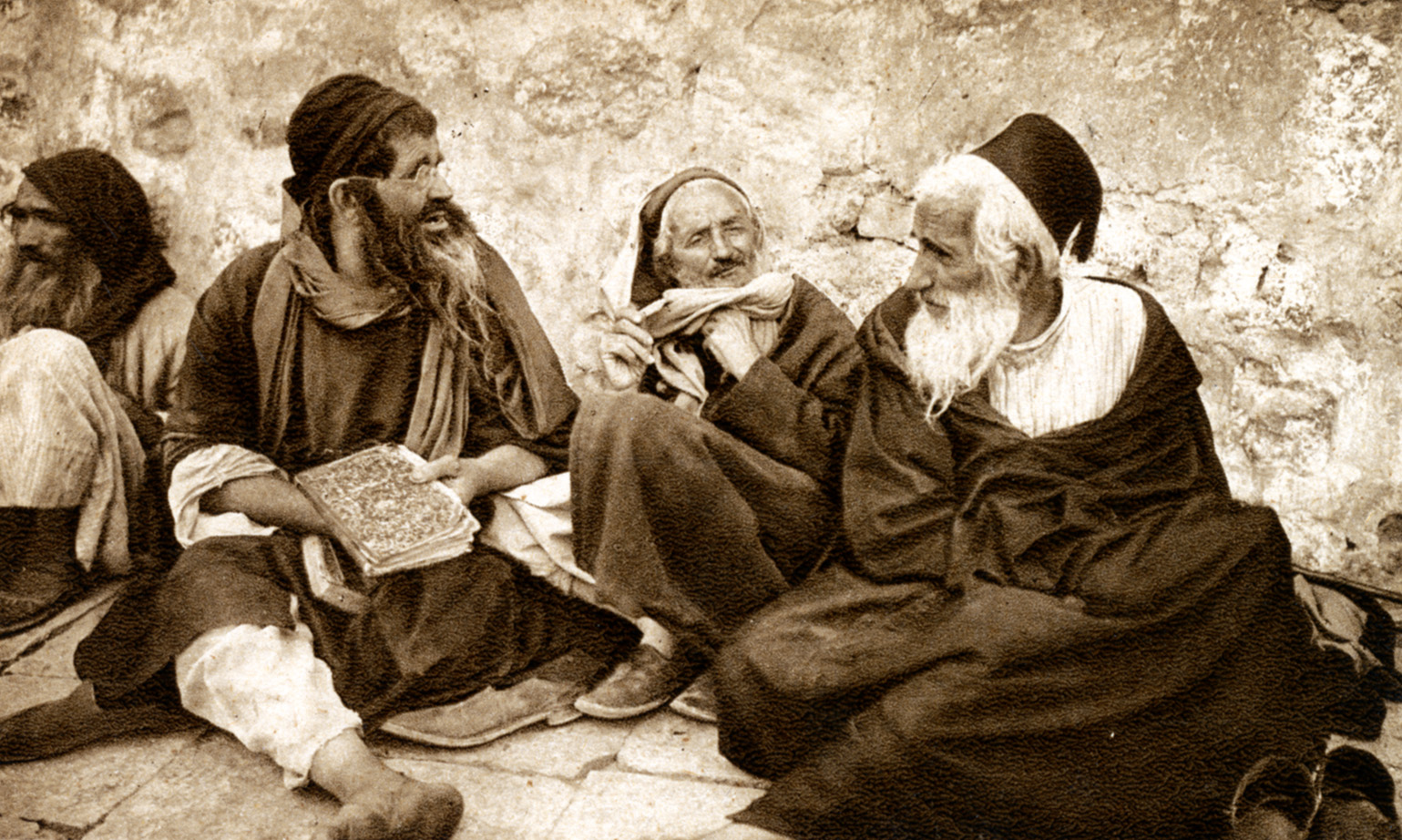
Jewish worshippers at the Wailing Wall

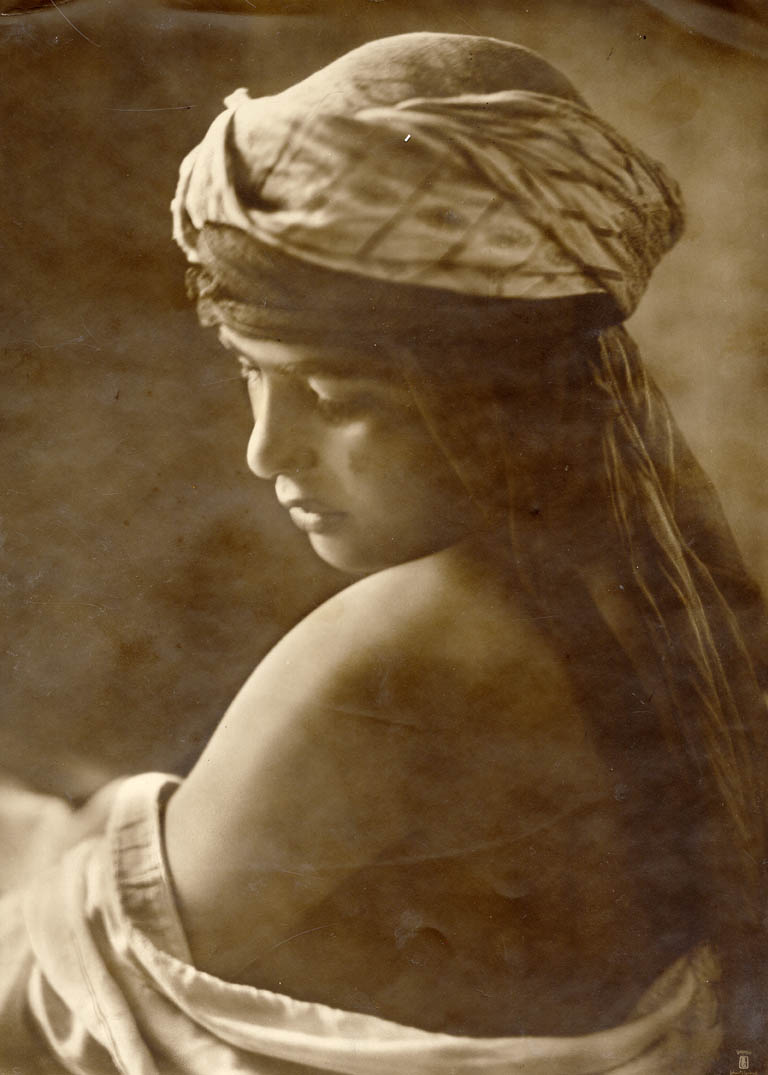
Girl named Ayada

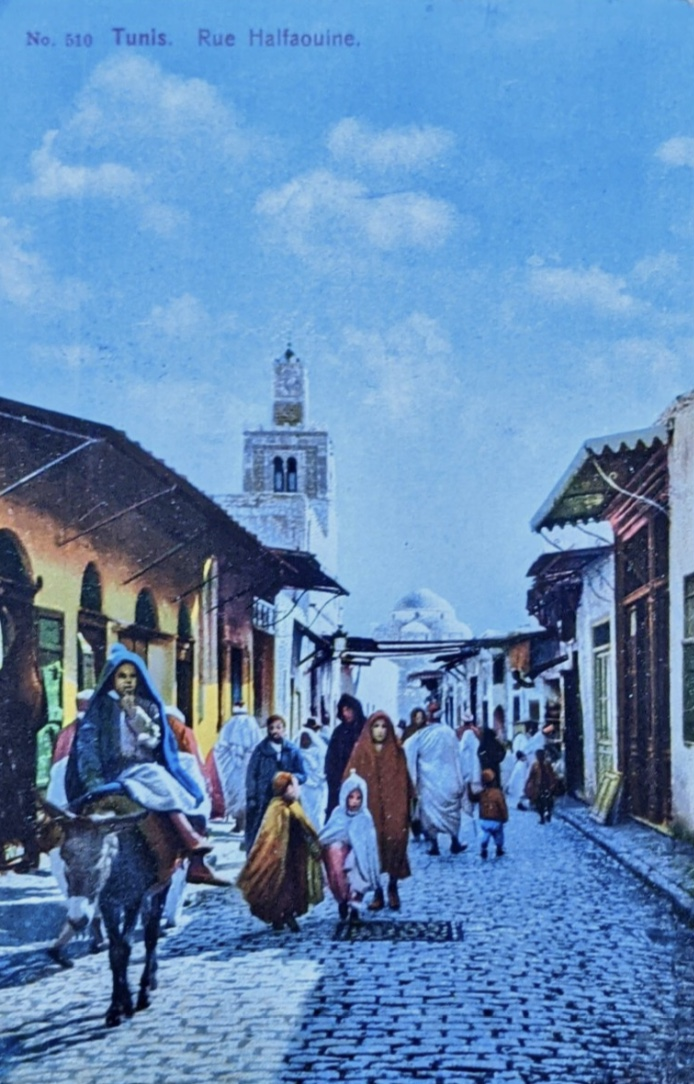
Tunis Rue Halfaouine, c. 1911

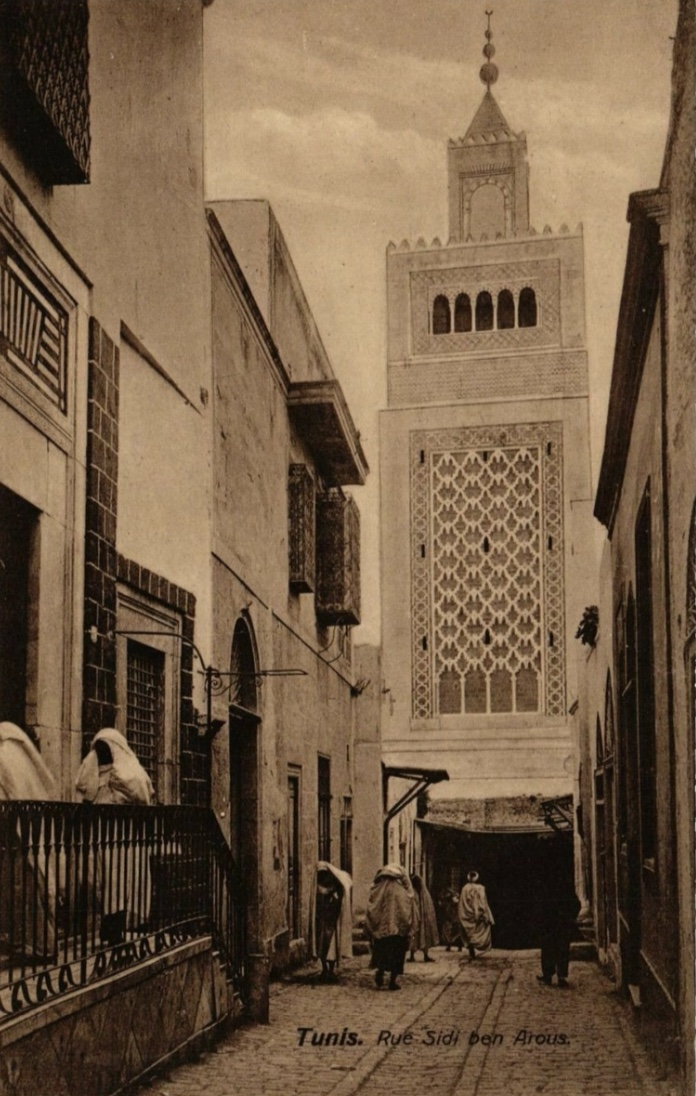
Tunis Rue Sidi ben Arous
