= Riccardo Jagmetti =

Swiss businessman, jurist and politician (1896–1964)

Member of the Cantonal Council of Zurich
- In office 5 May 1947 – 26 April 1959

Personal details
- Born: Riccardo James Jagmetti; 3 December 1896 Buenos Aires, Argentina
- Died: 3 August 1964 (aged 67) Zurich, Switzerland
- Citizenship: Switzerland; Argentina
- Spouse: Esther Hürlimann (m. 1926)
- Relations: Hürlimann family (by marriage)
- Children: 4, including Riccardo and Carlo
- Education: University of Zurich (JD)
- Occupation: Businessman; jurist; politician

Military service
- Allegiance: Switzerland
- Branch/service: Swiss Armed Forces
- Rank: Oberstleutnant

Riccardo James Jagmetti colloquially Riccardo Jagmetti (3 December 1896 – 3 August 1964) was a Swiss businessman, jurist and politician who served on the Cantonal Council of Zurich from 1947 to 1959 for the Free Democratic Party. He was a member of the Hürlimann family by marriage.

== Early life and education ==
Jagmetti was born 3 December 1896 in Buenos Aires, Argentina, the second of two children, of Antoine "Louis" Etienne Jagmetti, a merchant, and Maria "Helene" Jagmetti (née Baumann; 1858–1949). He had an older sister.

His paternal family originally hailed from Mairengo in Ticino, Switzerland. His mother was raised in Brittnau, Aargau, as the daughter of the Reformed pastor Johann Jakob Baumann, originally from Stilli near Aarau.

His initial years were spent in Argentina, until returning to Switzerland in 1905 with his mother. He ultimately attended schools in Zurich, where he excelled in Latin and Greek. Between 1915 and 1920, Jagmetti studied at University of Zurich, where he completed his Juris Doctor.

== Personal life ==
In 1926, Jagmetti married Anna Maria "Esther" Hürlimann (1906–1990), the youngest daughter of Albert Heinrich Hürlimann, proprietor of the Hürlimann Brewery, and Anna Bertha Hürlimann (née Hirzel). They had four children:

- Antoinette Esther Jagmetti, married to Dr. Robert Carl Habich (1915–1988), with issue.
- Riccardo "Rico" L. Jagmetti (born 1929), an attorney, politician and lecturer at ETH Zurich, married to Denise de Reynier, with issue.
- Carlo Jagmetti (born 1932), an attorney and diplomat who most notably served as Ambassador of Switzerland to the United States between 1993 and 1997, married Erica Honold, with issue.
- Marco Jagmetti (born 1935), an attorney, lecturer at the University of St. Gallen, married Corinne Giacometti, with issue including Luca Jagmetti, who served on the Cantonal Council of Zurich.

Jagmetti passed away 3 August 1964 in Zurich aged 67.
