= Regine Schindler =

Swiss writer (1935–2013)

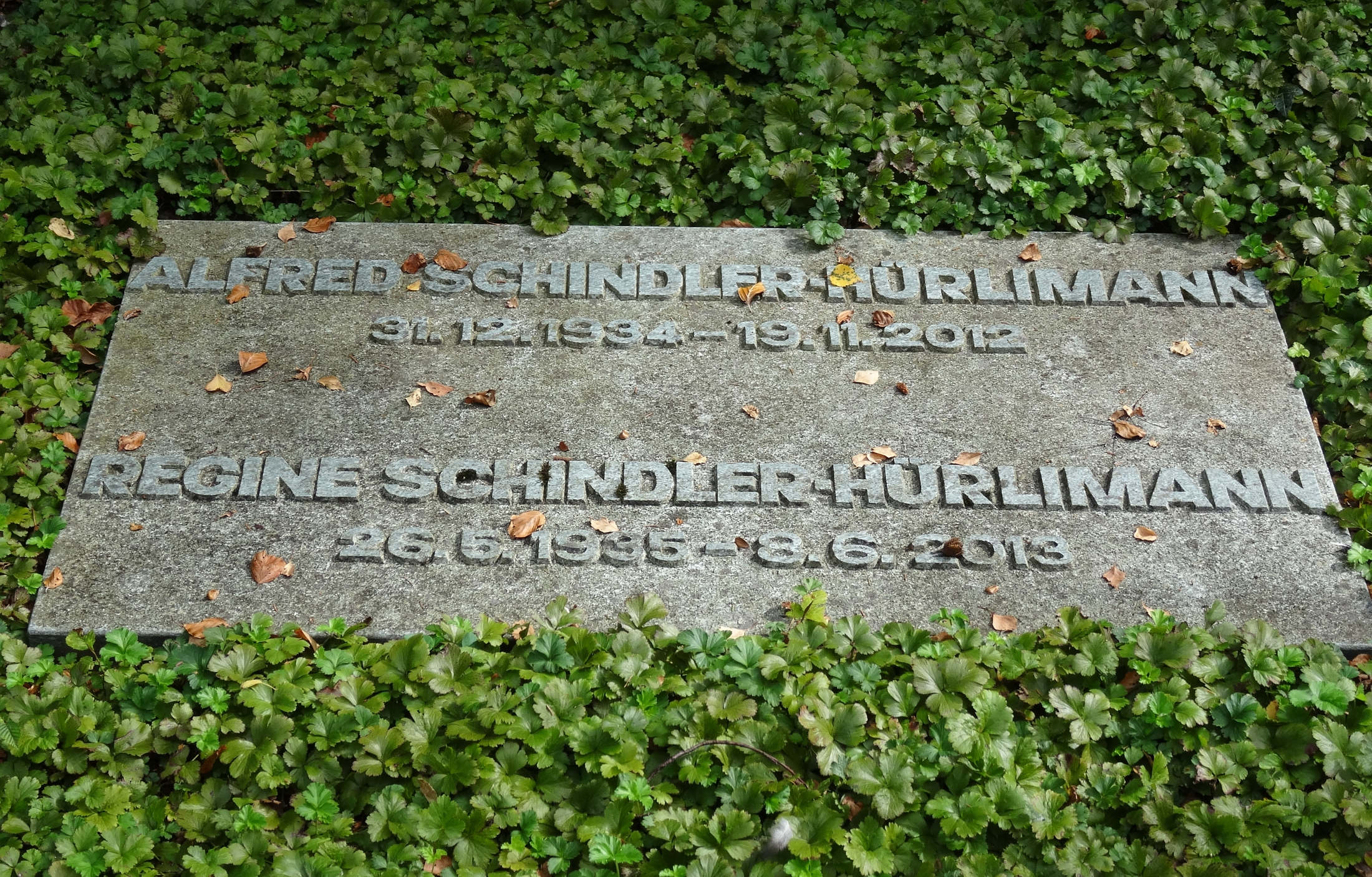
Her grave in the Friedhof Enzenbühl, Zürich

Regine Schindler (née Hürlimann; 26 May 1935 – 8 June 2013) was a German-born Swiss germanist and author who was primarily known as writer of religious children's literature as well as an expert for children's bibles. She was a daughter of Martin Hürlimann and hence member of the Hürlimann family.

She married Alfred Schindler (1934–2012), a theologian, with whom she had five children.
