= Carlo Jagmetti =

Swiss jurist and diplomat)

His Excellency Carlo Jagmetti

Ambassador of Switzerland to the United States
- In office 5 May 1993 – 26 March 1997
- Preceded by: Edouard Brunner
- Succeeded by: Alfred Defago

Personal details
- Born: Carlo Siro Franco Jagmetti; 14 July 1932 (age 94) Zurich, Switzerland
- Spouse: Erica Honold
- Relations: Hürlimann family
- Children: 2
- Parent: Riccardo Jagmetti (father)
- Occupation: Jurist; Diplomat

Carlo Siro Franco Jagmetti colloquially Carlo Jagmetti (born 14 July 1932) is a Swiss jurist and diplomat who most notably served as Ambassador of Switzerland to the United States from 1993 to 1997.

== Personal life ==
Jagmetti married Erica Honold, daughter of Fritz D. Honold and Elisabeth Honold (née Hegglin; 1909–1983), the owners of the traditional confectionery Honold in Zurich, which was founded in 1905. They had two children;

- Alessandro Jagmetti, married to Baroness Isabelle Pilars de Pilar, with whom he had two children.
- Cristina Jagmetti, 4th generation proprietor of Honold Confectionery married to Olivier de Perregaux (born 1965), chairman of LGT Group and heir to Girard-Perregaux, with whom she had two children.

He resides in Zurich, Switzerland.
