= Martin Hürlimann =

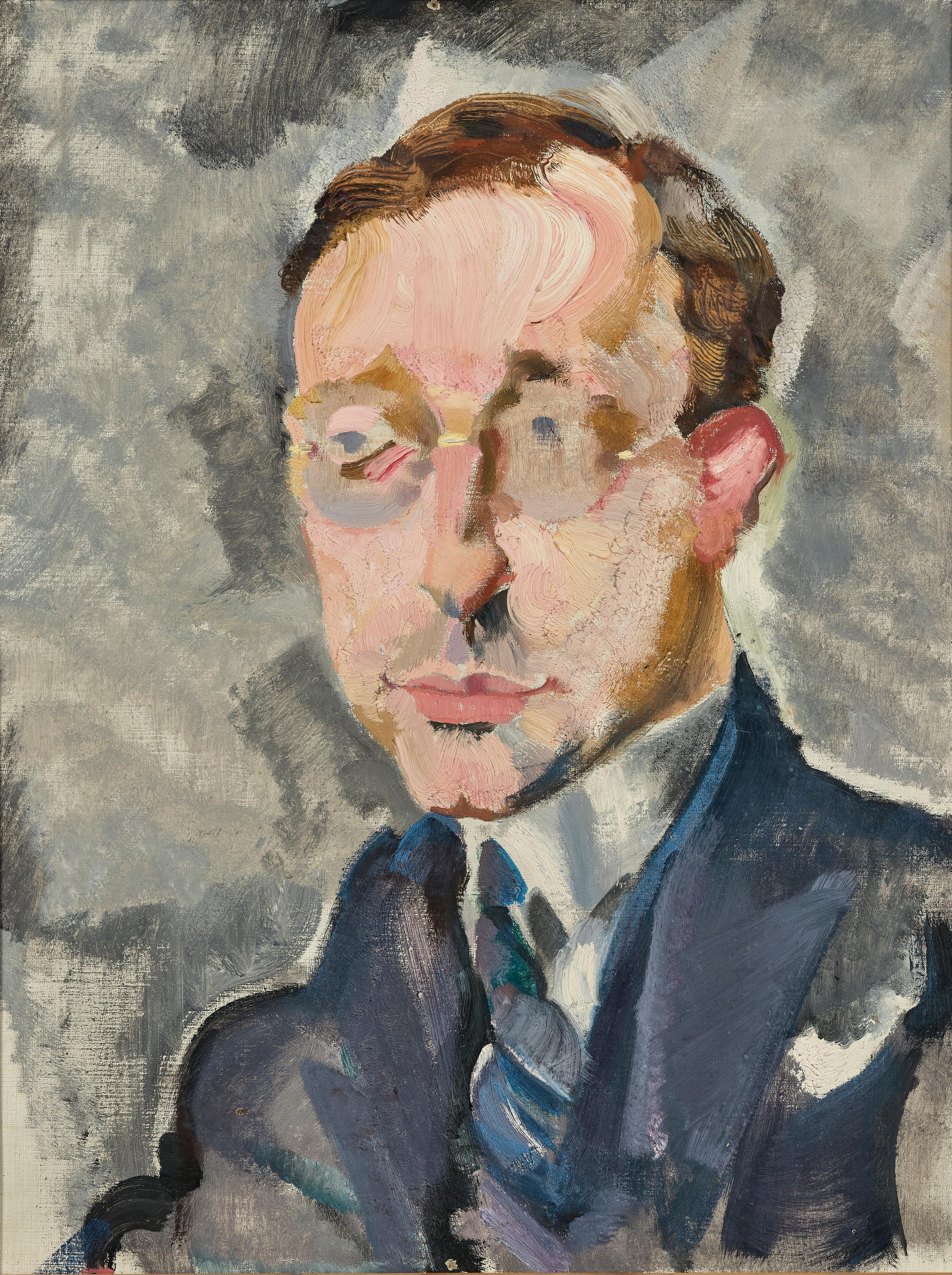
- Hürlimann portrayed by Max Oppenheimer c. 1929
- Born: Martin Axel Fritz Hürlimann; 12 November 1897; Zurich, Switzerland
- Died: 4 March 1984 (aged 86); Zurich, Switzerland
- Occupations: Publisher, photographer
- Spouse: Bettina Kiepenheuer (m. 1933; died 1983)
- Children: 4, including Regine
- Family: Hürlimann family

Martin Axel Fritz Hürlimann colloquially Martin Hürlimann (12 November 1897 – 4 March 1984) was a Swiss publisher and photographer. He was a member of the Hürlimann family.

== Early life and education ==
Hürlimann was born 12 November 1897 in Zurich, Switzerland, the youngest of seven children, to Albert "Heinrich" Hürlimann (1857–1934), proprietor of the Hürlimann Brewery, and Anna Bertha Hürlimann (née Hirzel; 1867–1949), into an affluent Protestant family.

He successfully completed his Matura in Frauenfeld and went on to study History, German literature and Philosophy at Zürich, Leipzig and Berlin universities. His doctoral thesis, submitted and accepted in 1924, was entitled Die Aufklärung in Zürich. Die Entwicklung des Zürcher Protestantismus im 18. Jahrhundert.

== Career ==
In 1929, Hürlimann founded the newspaper "Atlantis", based in Berlin and specialising in international travel and related themes. In 1930, he founded "Atlantis Verlag", a publishing house, taking over from Ernest Wasmuth publication of the "Orbis Terrarum" series of books. In 1936, he founded a Zürich branch of "Atlantis Verlag", and by 1939, with the outbreak of war, had relocated his head office to Zürich, while retaining a German branch across the border at Freiburg im Breisgau.

His photographic work was published in a number of books. Western European cities were a common theme, but he also photographed Ceylon and Southeast Asia. In the 1930 English edition of his book Burma, Ceylon, Indo-China, Hürlimann wrote "My photographs were chiefly taken with a Sinclair Una camera, Zeiss lens, and Kodak films."

== Personal life ==
In 1933, Hürlimann married German-born Bettina Kiepenheuer (1909–1983), the author of Three Centuries of Children's Books in Europe, published 1967, daughter of Gustav Karl Kiepenheuer, also a publisher, and Irmgard Kiepenheuer (née Funcke). Her father later founded Kiepenheuer & Witsch (which ultimately merged into Holtzbrinck). They had four children;

- Barbara Hürlimann (1933–1972), married German-born Demetrio Boersner (1930–2016), a political journalist in Caracas, with whom she had three children.
- Regine Hürlimann (1935–2013), germanist and author, married to Alfred Schindler (1934–2012), a theologian, with whom she had five children.
- Christoph Hürlimann, married Rose-Marianne Gerber, with whom he had four children.
- Ulrich Hürlimann (1942–1979), never married and without issue.

Hürlimann resided in Uerikon, Switzerland.

== Books ==
- Burma, Ceylon, Indo-China - Siam, Cambodia, Annam, Tongking, Yunnan, B. Westermann Co. Inc., New York, 1930
- India, The Landscape, The Monuments and the People. D. B. Taraporevala Sons & Co. Bombay. 1932.
- Bilder aus Berlin, Potsdam und Umgebung, Atlantis Verlag Berlin, 1936
- Delhi, Agra, Fatehpur Sikri, Thames & Hudson, London, 1965.
- Gothic cathedrals: Paris, Chartres, Amiens, Reims, B.H. Blackwell, Ltd, 1938 (reprinted from the German, Atlantis-Verlag A.-G. Zürich, 1937)
- Englische Kathedralen, Atlantis Verlag AG, Zurich, 1948, translation Thames and Hudson, London
- Eternal France, Thames & Hudson. 1952 — 216 b/w photographs in photogravure
- Italy, Thames & Hudson. 1953 — 225 b/w photographs in photogravure
- London, Thames & Hudson 1956 — 115 b/w photographs in photogravure, six colour plates, introduced by Eric Walter White
- Europe, Thames & Hudson 1957
- Asia, Thames & Hudson 1957
- Traveller in the Orient,

Atlantis Verlag AG, Zurich, 1959, translation Thames and Hudson, London, 1960

- Asia, Thames & Hudson 1957
