= Bon vivant =

Bon vivant is a French expression denoting someone who enjoys the good things in life, especially food and drink. Bon viveur is a less common pseudo-French expression.

It may also refer to:

- Bon Viveur, a pseudonym used jointly by culinary writers Fanny Cradock and her husband Johnnie Cradock
- Bon Vivant, a defunct New Jersey based soup company known for the 1971 Bon Vivant botulism incident
