= Calanda Bräu =

Swiss brewery

Coordinates: 46.8475°N 9.5231°E

Calanda Bräu logo

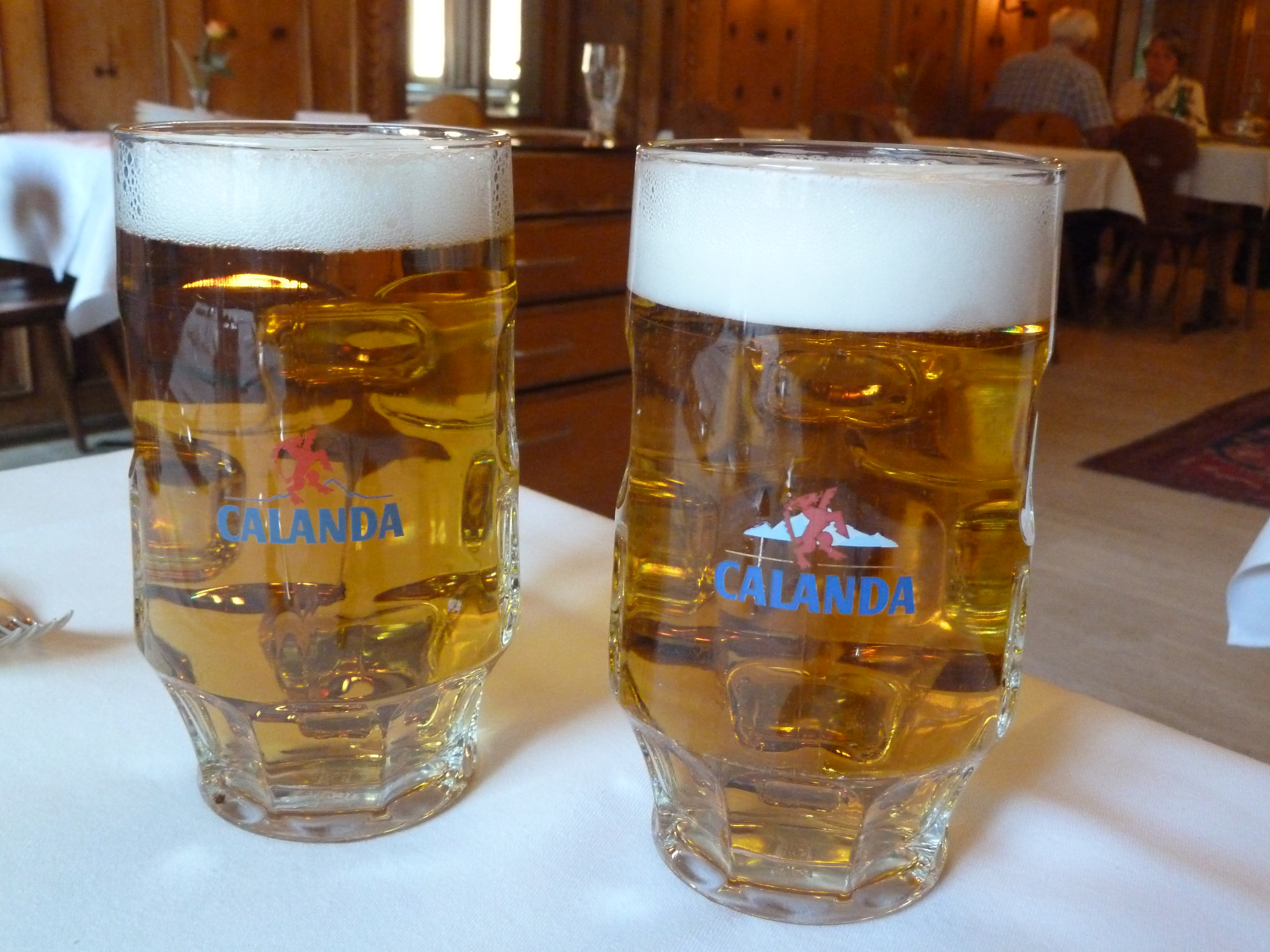
Calanda beer served in Tiefencastle

Calanda Bräu (German for "Calanda Brew") is a brewery in Chur, in the Canton of Graubünden, Switzerland, owned by Heineken N.V. Its lagers, brewed using Alpine spring water, are available across Switzerland.

== History ==
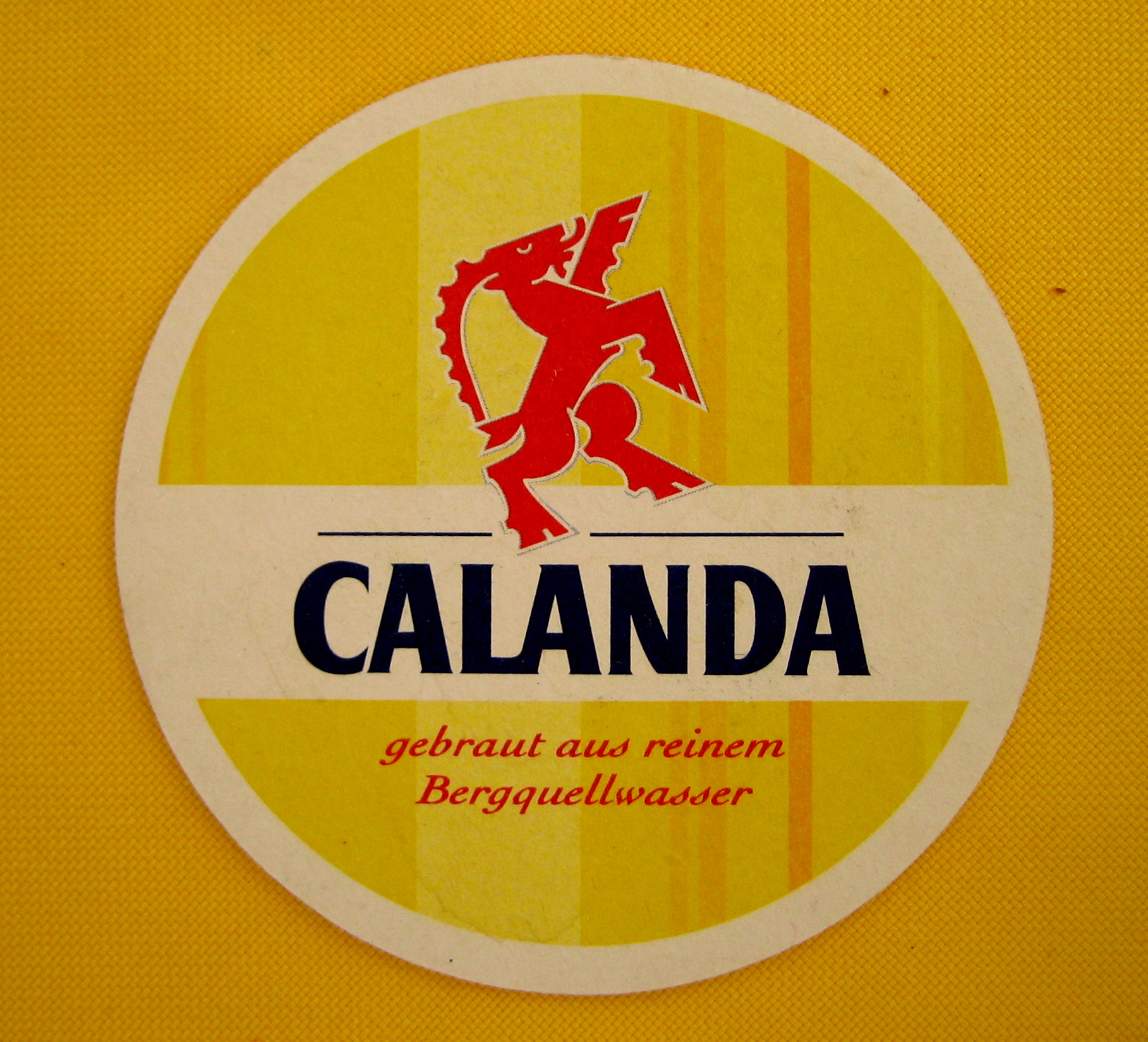
Beermat

The Calanda Bräu name dates from 1971, as the new name of the Rhätische Aktienbräuerei (itself dating from 1902), which at the time had control over all independent breweries in the Canton of Graubünden. The regional Brauerei Haldengut in Winterthur joined in 1989, forming Calanda Haldengut.

In 1993, Calanda Haldengut was acquired by Heineken. After the merger, Heineken moved brewing of Haldengut beer to Chur, and closed the Winterthur brewery. As of 2008, Calanda and Haldengut are both marketed across Switzerland, with a modest national market share of 2.7% each. Beginning in 2013, the brewery also bottles beer from the Heineken-owned Brauerei Eichhof in Lucerne; the beer is transported by train to Chur.

== See also ==
- Beer in Switzerland
- Feldschlösschen, the major competitor brewery owned by Carlsberg
