= BFM (brewery) =

Brewery in Saignelégier, Switzerland

Franches-Montagnes Brewery
- Native name: Brasserie des Franches-Montagnes
- Industry: Alcoholic beverage
- Founded: 1997
- Headquarters: Chemin Des Buissons 8, Saignelégier, Jura, Switzerland
- Products: Beer
- Owner: Jerome Rebetez

The Brasserie des Franches-Montagnes (BFM) is a small, artisanal brewery in Saignelégier, Jura, Switzerland, whose products, including barrel-aged beers, have drawn international acclaim. Founded in 1997 by Jérôme Rebetez, a trained oenologist, the brewery is known for making beers that stray outside traditional beer style guidelines and use unorthodox ingredients. The brewery takes its name from its home district.

BFM's products are made in small batches and packaged by hand at the brewery.

== Beers ==
- Abbaye de Saint Bon-Chien (usually around 11% ABV), A strong, dark, wine-like beer released annually. Barrel-aged, with a complex, sour character. While the primary batch for each year is blended from different barrels, "Grand Cru" versions selected from individual barrels have also been made available to the US market.
- Cuvée du (n)ème (varying by batch between 6 % and 8% ABV), is a special brewed every year for the public brewing session at the beginning of November, and named after the number of the batch (6ème, 7ème, etc.). All are unfiltered, top-fermented, bottle-conditioned ales.
- La Cuivree A Pilsner.
- √ 225 (5.0% ABV) A saison matured in Saint Bon-Chien oak barrels.
- La Cuvée Alex le Rouge (10.276% ABV) Labeled as a "Jurassian" Imperial Stout.
- La Dragonne (7.0% ABV) A beer brewed with honey and spices, meant to be served heated.
- La Mandragore (8.0% ABV) A dark ale.
- La Meule (6.0% ABV) Labeled a "Swiss Golden Ale", this strong pale ale is flavored with sage.
- La Salamandre (5.5% ABV) A witbier.
- La Torpille (7.5% ABV) A dark ale with spices and prunes.
- Tarry Suchong A beer made with Lapsang Souchong tea, giving a distinctly smoky flavor.
