= Rudolf Franz Lehnert =

Austrian photographer (1878–1948)

- Born: 13 July 1878; Groß Aupa (Velká Úpa), Petzer Pec pod Sněžkou, Royal Bohemia, Imp. & R. Austria-Hungary
- Died: 16 January 1948 (aged 69); Redeyef, French protectorate of Tunisia

Rudolf Franz Lehnert (13 July 1878 – 16 January 1948) was an Austrian photographer. He was noted for producing Orientalist images.

== Life ==
Lehnert was born in Groß Aupa, Eastern Giant Mountains, northern Bohemia, Kingdom of Bohemia, Austria-Hungary (now Velká Úpa, a district of Pec pod Sněžkou (German: Petzer unter der Schneekoppe) in the Czech Republic).

He first travelled to Tunis in 1904, and in 1904 he again visited with his friend, and subsequent business partner, Ernst Heinrich Landrock. The pair established a photographic studio in Tunis and worked closely for more than 20 years. They later established studios in successively, Munich, Leipzig and Cairo, publishing the works as by "Lehnert & Landrock".

Lehnert spent the last part of his life at Redeyef, Gafza Oasis, Tunisia, where he died.

== See also ==
- List of Orientalist artists
- Orientalism
