= Feldschlösschen =

Swiss beverage company

Coordinates: 47°32′48″N 7°47′09″E

Feldschlösschen Getränke AG
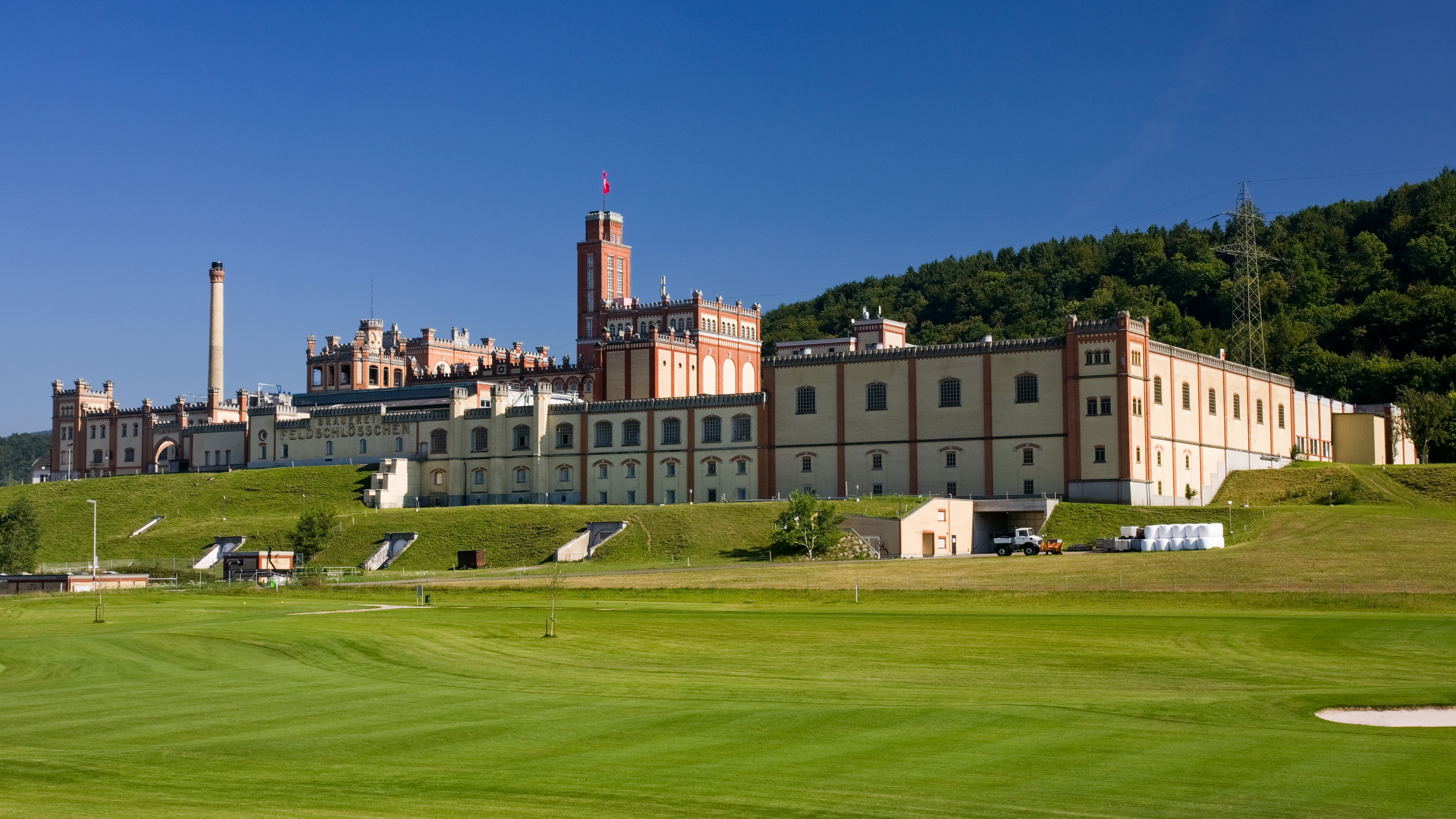
- The Feldschlösschen Brewery is in the shape of a castle
- Company type: Subsidiary
- Industry: Beverages
- Founded: 1876
- Founders: Theophil Roniger; Mathias Wüthrich
- Headquarters: Rheinfelden, Aargau, Switzerland
- Parent: Carlsberg Group
- Website: https://feldschloesschen.swiss/en/

Feldschlösschen is a Swiss beverage and brewing company based in Rheinfelden, in the German-speaking canton of Aargau, Switzerland. Founded in 1876, the company operates the biggest brewery in Switzerland by production, the Feldschlösschen Brewery. It bought out Cardinal in 1991, and became a division of Carlsberg in 2000. In addition to beer, it also produces non-alcoholic beverages and mineral waters.

== History ==
Feldschlösschen was founded in 1876 by the brewer Theophil Roniger, the son of an innkeeper, and Mathias Wüthrich, the son of wealthy farmer. The brewery was built on Bözberg railway line. Its castle-style building, which is still maintained today, gave the brewery the name Feldschlösschen (lit. 'small castle of the field'). Converted into a joint-stock company in 1890, Feldschlösschen benefitted from its favorable location and the purchase and closure of breweries throughout Switzerland, becoming the country's largest beer producer in 1898.

In 1970s, Feldschlösschen began producing non-alcoholic beverages. It acquired the breweries Warteck in 1989 and Sibra in 1991. Feldschlösschen held a 46% share of the Swiss beer market in 1996, when it merged with Hürlimann (7% share) to form Feldschlösschen-Hürlimann Holding (FHH), which became a real estate company in 2000 after selling the beverages business to the Danish company Carlsberg.

== Products ==
Feldschlösschen produces the following brands:

- Feldschlösschen
- Feldschlösschen Alcohol Free
- Hürlimann (merged in 1996)
- Cardinal (acquired in 1991)
- Carlsberg
- Tuborg
- Sommersby
- Pepsi
- Gurten
- Valaisanne
- Warteck
- Castello (beer)
- Schweppes
- 7up
- Lipton Ice Tea

== Similarly named German brewer ==
Feldschlößchen (with the eszett, ß) (Note: Swiss German always uses ss in place of the eszett ß) is the name of a brewer in Dresden, Germany, with no relation. See: Feldschlößchen (Dresden).

== See also ==
- Beer in Switzerland
- Calanda Bräu, the main competitor brewery, owned by Heineken
