= Cardinal Brewery =

Swiss brand of beer

Coordinates: 46°47′52″N 7°08′52″E

Cardinal
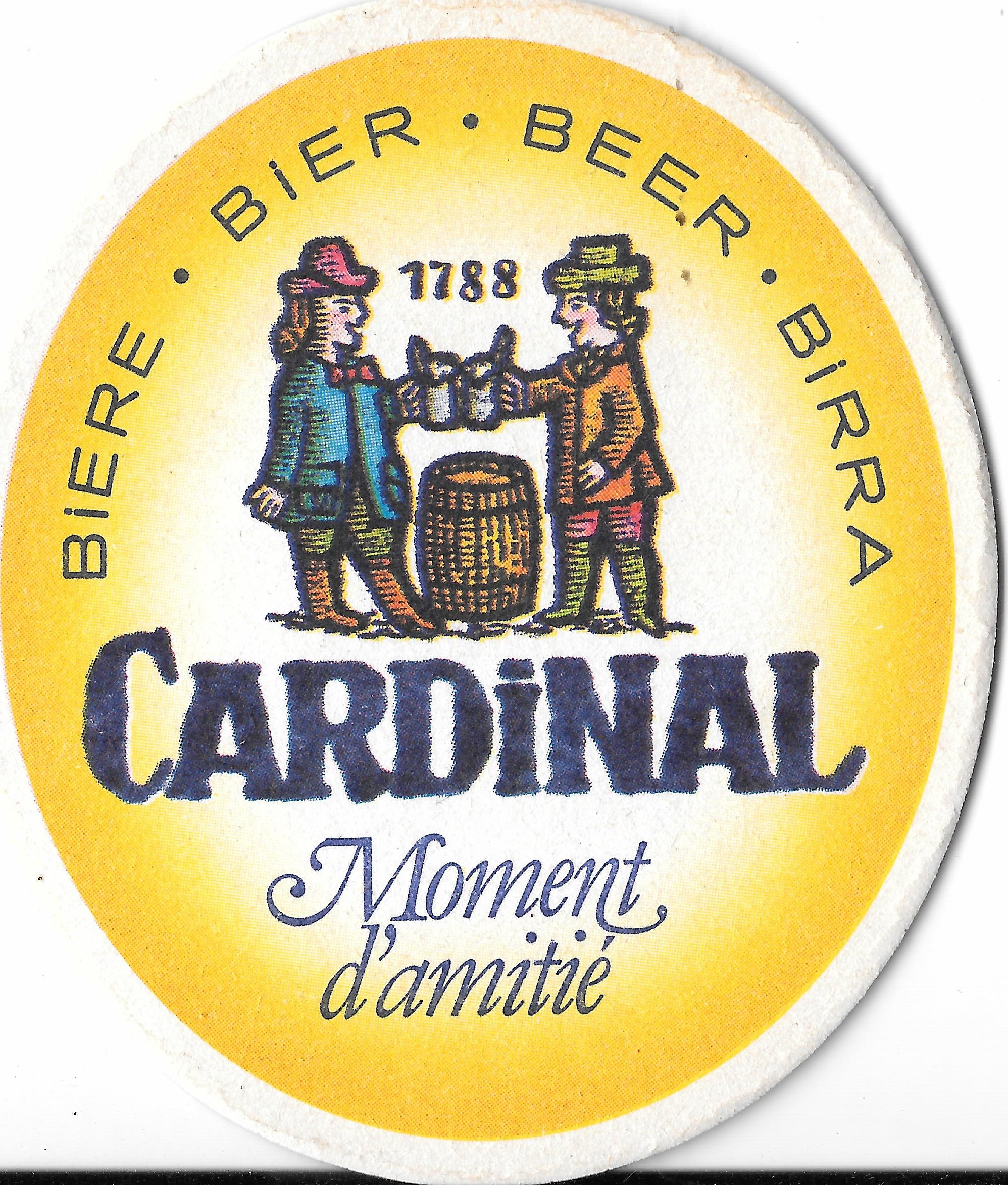

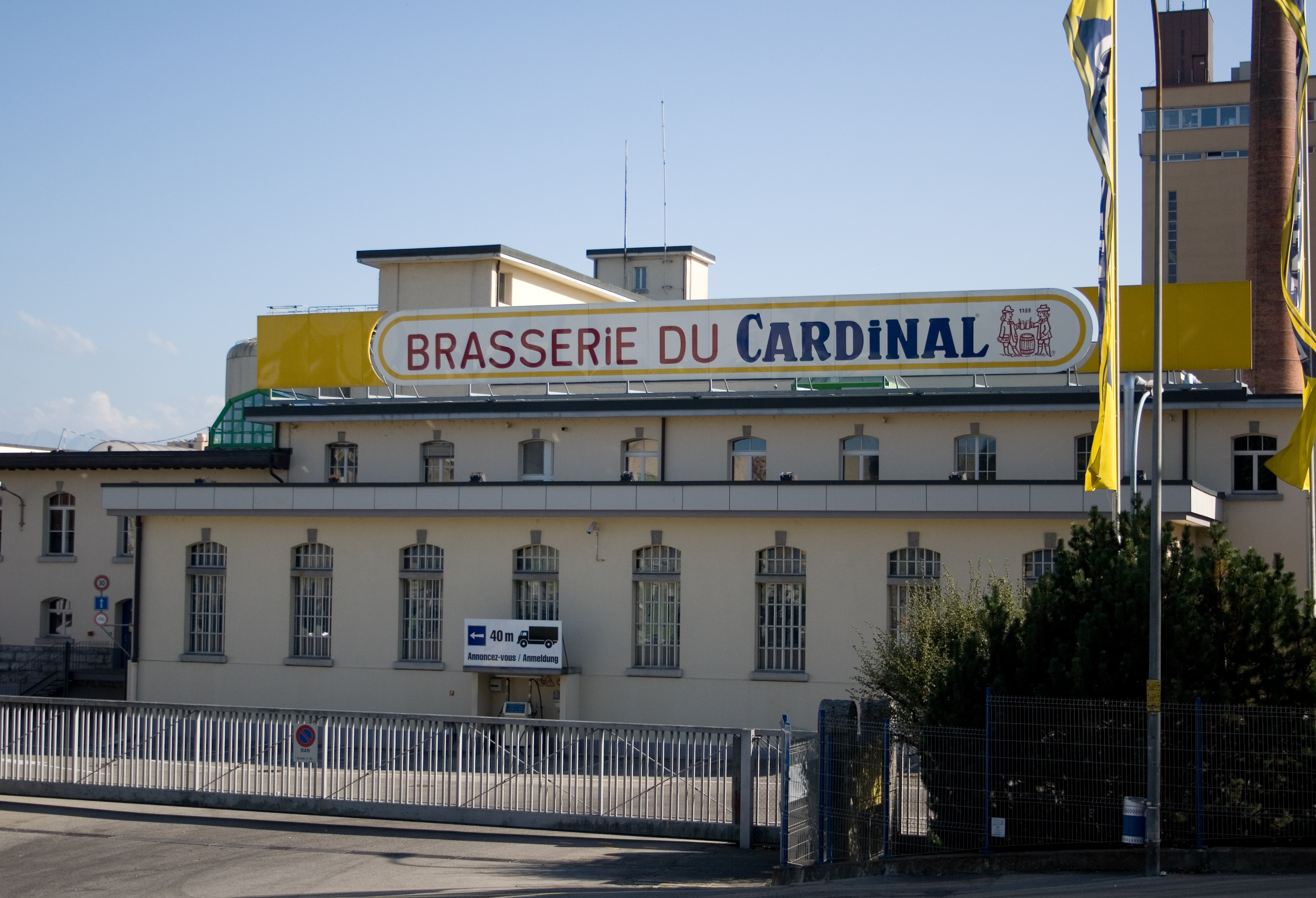
- The former brewery in Fribourg in 2007
- Industry: Alcoholic beverage
- Founded: 1788
- Fate: Acquired by Feldschlösschen in 1991, closed in 2011
- Headquarters: Fribourg, Switzerland
- Products: Beer
- Owner: Feldschlösschen (part of Carlsberg Group)

Cardinal is a Swiss brand of beer and a former brewery founded in 1788 by François Piller, located in Fribourg. The brewery was acquired by Feldschlösschen in 1991, which itself was acquired by the Carlsberg Group in 2000.

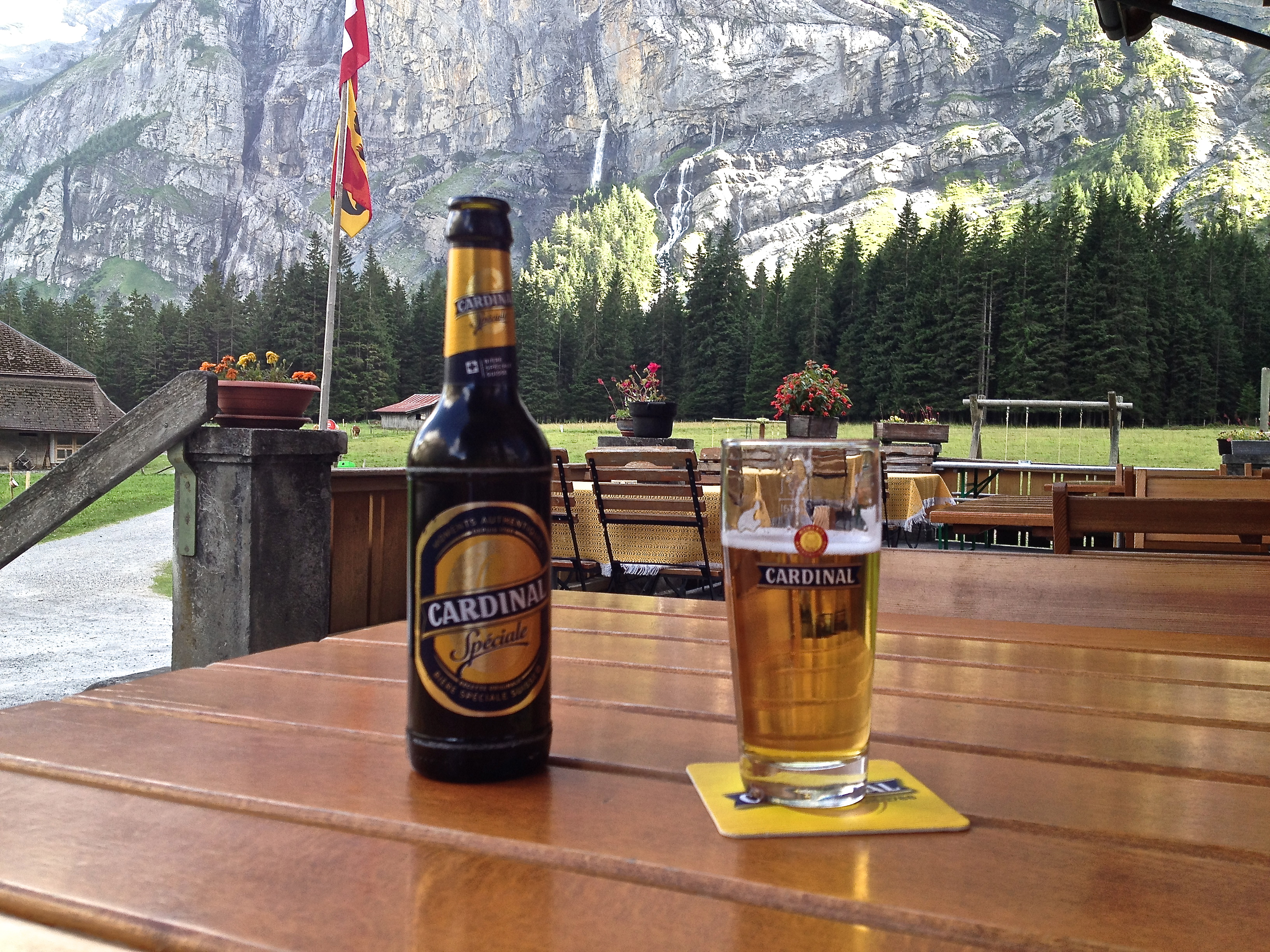
Cardinal Spéciale, served in the Bernese Oberland

The brewery in Fribourg was closed in 2011, and today Cardinal is brewed at the Feldschlösschen brewery in Rheinfelden, Aargau.

The flagship beer of the Cardinal brand is Cardinal Blonde, a pale lager, which is heavily promoted in the country.

== History ==
Cardinal goes back to the brewery founded in 1788 by the innkeeper François Piller. The business, in the Lower Town of Fribourg, was taken over in 1877 by Paul-Alcide Blancpain, who adopted the name Brasserie du Cardinal in 1890, when Bishop Gaspard Mermillod was made a cardinal. In 1904 Cardinal moved to the Pérolles plateau, and in 1907 it became a joint-stock company. From the 1960s it produced Sinalco lemonade.

In 1970 the holding company Sibra was created in Fribourg, grouping the breweries Cardinal and Beauregard in Fribourg, Weber AG in Wädenswil, La Comète in La Chaux-de-Fonds and Salmen in Rheinfelden. In 1972 Sibra launched a marketing campaign to impose the Cardinal brand on all the breweries of the holding. In 1991 Feldschlösschen bought Sibra, and in 1996 it announced the closure of the Fribourg site, which was kept after the intervention of the Fribourg authorities and with the support of the population. The workforce fell from 220 in 1996 to 75 in 2010. The Danish Carlsberg Group, owner of Feldschlösschen since 2000, decided in 2010 to close the Fribourg site and to move the production of Cardinal beer to Rheinfelden in 2011. The state and the city of Fribourg took over the factory site on June 1, 2012, for 21.5 million Swiss francs to build a technology and innovation park there.
