= Ernst Heinrich Landrock =

German photographer (1878–1966)

Ernst Heinrich Landrock (4 August 1878 in Reinsdorf, Saxony – 30 April 1966 in Kreuzlingen, Switzerland) was a photographer who was based in Tunis, Leipzig and Cairo. He is known for his works with Rudolf Franz Lehnert, published as "Lehnert & Landrock".
