= Hürlimann Brewery =

Brewery in Zürich, Switzerland, now owned by Carlsberg

Coordinates: 47°21′52″N 8°31′33″E

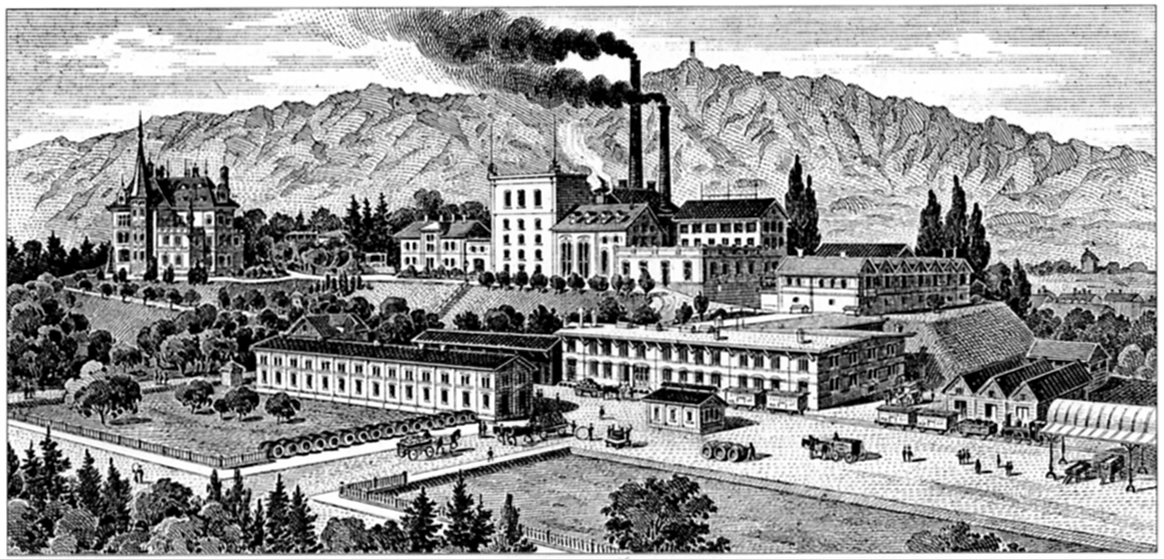
- Native name: Brauerei Hürlimann
- Type: Private
- Founded: 1836; 190 years ago
- Founder: Hans Heinrich Hürlimann
- Defunct: 1996
- Fate: Merged with Feldschlösschen
- Number of employees: 250 (1996)

Hürlimann Brewery (German: Brauerei Hürlimann AG or Hürlimann Bier) was a Swiss brewery in Zurich, Switzerland. Founded in 1836, it became one of the largest and most successful breweries, until it ceased operations in 1996. It was merged with Feldschlösschen (which ultimately was owned by Carlsberg).

== History ==
In 1836, Hans Heinrich Hürlimann, Dr. Staub and Maximilian Schenkenberg, all without much brewing knowledge founded the brewery in Feldbach near Hombrechtikon. Hürlimann owned the mill which originally belonged to the Bühler family, Staub was a local physician and Schenkenberg was a bon vivant who seemingly had the capital for such an endeavour.

Schenkenberg who was supposed to manage the company turned out to be a fraud. He had obtained his capital through illegitimate money changing activities, and was actually never managing the brewery, instead he wanted to create a social club, which never was profitable. Hürlimann later turned him over and took sole ownership of the brewery. The success of the firm came with his son, Albert "Heinrich" Hürlimann (1857–1934), who was actually educated as a brewer in Germany, and scaled the business considerably.

Hurlimann was one of the principal brewing companies of Switzerland (the other big ones being Calanda Bräu, Feldschlösschen and Cardinal Brewery). The founder was a world leader in the scientific study of yeast, and the brewery had a long history of yeast development.

== Ownership ==
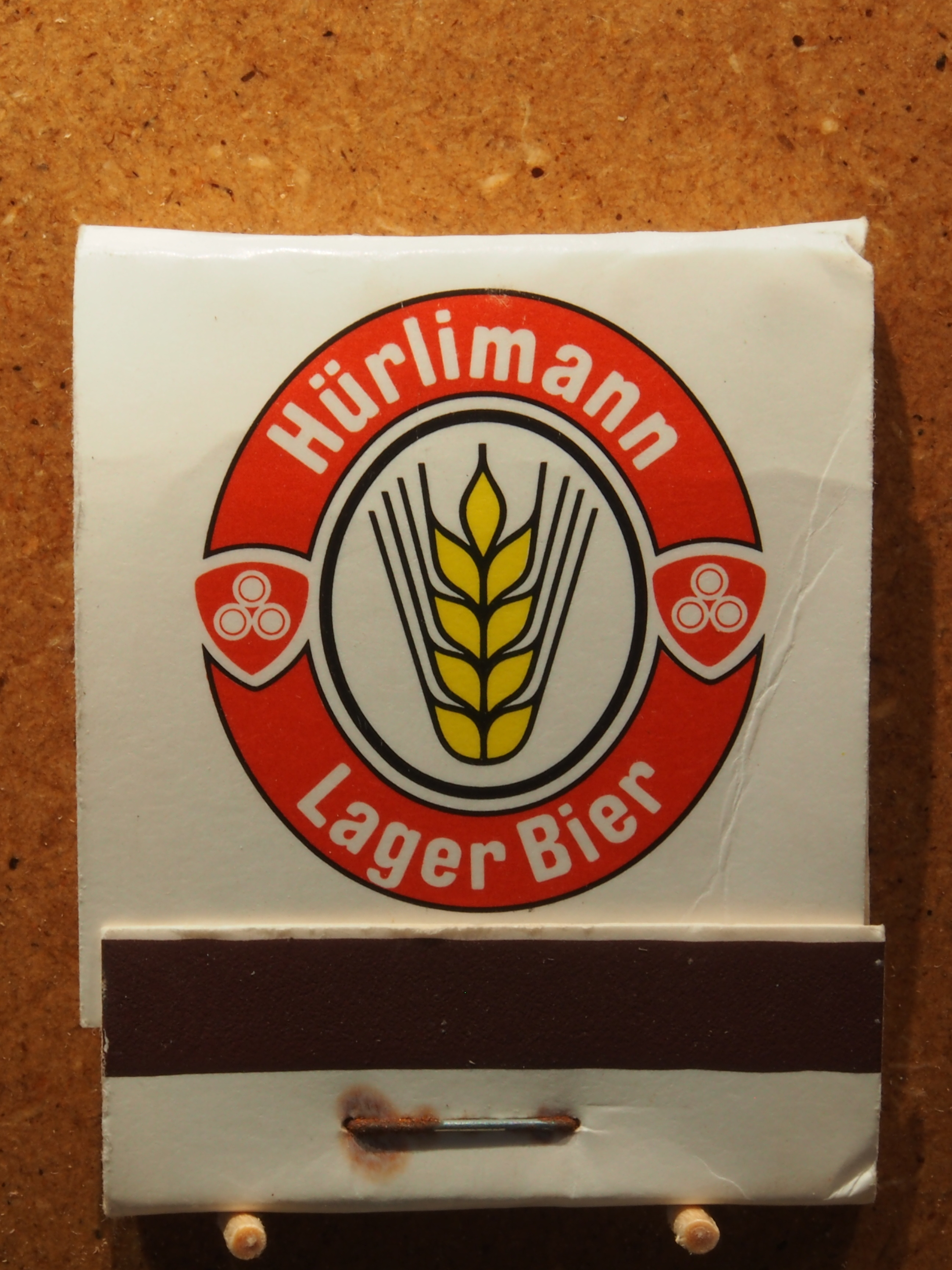
Hürlimann logo on a matchbook

Hürlimann was absorbed by Feldschlösschen in 1996. Feldschlösschen-Hürlimann-Gruppe was sold to Carlsberg in November 2000. Hürlimann's Sternbrau is now brewed by Shepherd Neame to its original recipe.

== Brands ==
=== Samichlaus ===
Hürlimann was famous for brewing the extremely potent beer Samichlaus ("Santa Claus") (250ml and 330ml bottles; 14% ABV). It was a Heller-Bock or Dunkel-Bock that was made every year on December 6 and then sold the following year. It was not brewed from 1996 to 2000 due to Feldschlösschen having no interest in doing so. The rights and recipe were sold by Carlsberg to Austrian brewer Schloss Eggenberger in 2000, who now manufacture it in 750ml bottles.

=== Retired brands ===
- Birell [275ml bottle; 0.8% ABV],
- Hürlimann Caesarus Imperator Heller Bock [330ml; 12.5% ABV]
- Hürlimann Spezial Export Bier [355ml can, 5.2% ABV],
- Hürlimann Festbier [330ml; 5.2% ABV]
- Hürlimann Five Star [330ml bottle; 5.2% ABV]
- Hürlimann Gold Premium [330ml bottle;5.2% ABV]
- Hürlimann Hammer [330ml bottle; 5% ABV]
- Hürlimann Hexenbrau ("Witch Beer") [330mml bottle; 5.4% ABV]
- Hürlimann Panaché [500 ml can; 1.9% ABV (40% Lager Beer, 60% Lemonade)]
- Hürlimann Sternbräu ("Star Beer") [500 ml Bottle, 500 ml can, or draft; 5.2% ABV].

=== Current brands ===
Birell was manufactured for a while by Shepherd Neame, but was soon discontinued.

Coopers in Australia are brewing to Brauerei Hürlimann's original Birell formula for the ultra light under license from Carlsberg using Australian malted barley, hops and yeast.

Hürlimann Sternbrau Lager: Export Bier [330 ml or 500 ml Bottle, 500 ml can, or draft keg; 4.8% ABV]. Shepherd Neame manufactures this beer in Britain and exports it to Europe.
