= Vaclav Ourednik =

Swiss natural scientist of Czech origin

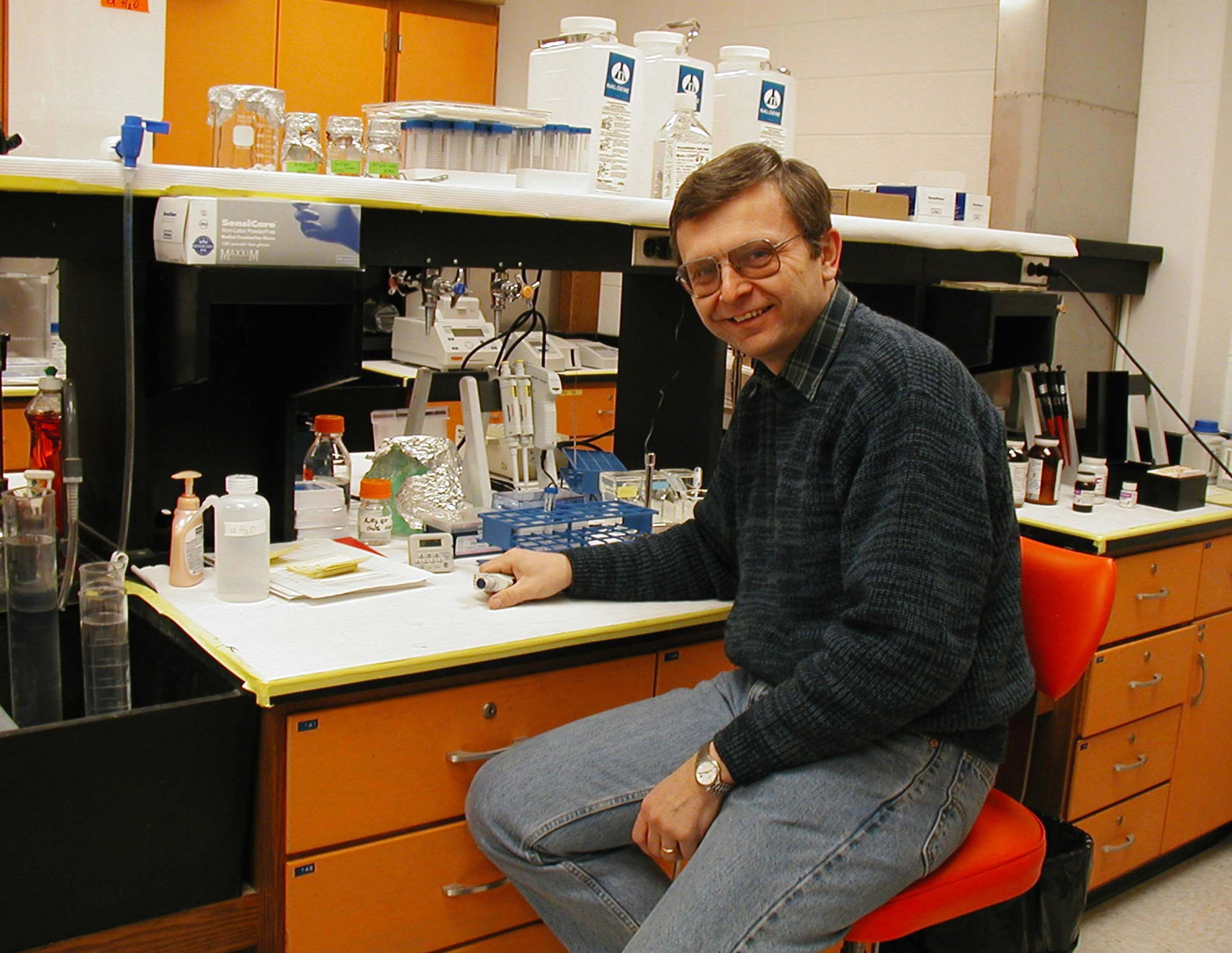
Václav Ourednik at Harvard Medical School, 2002

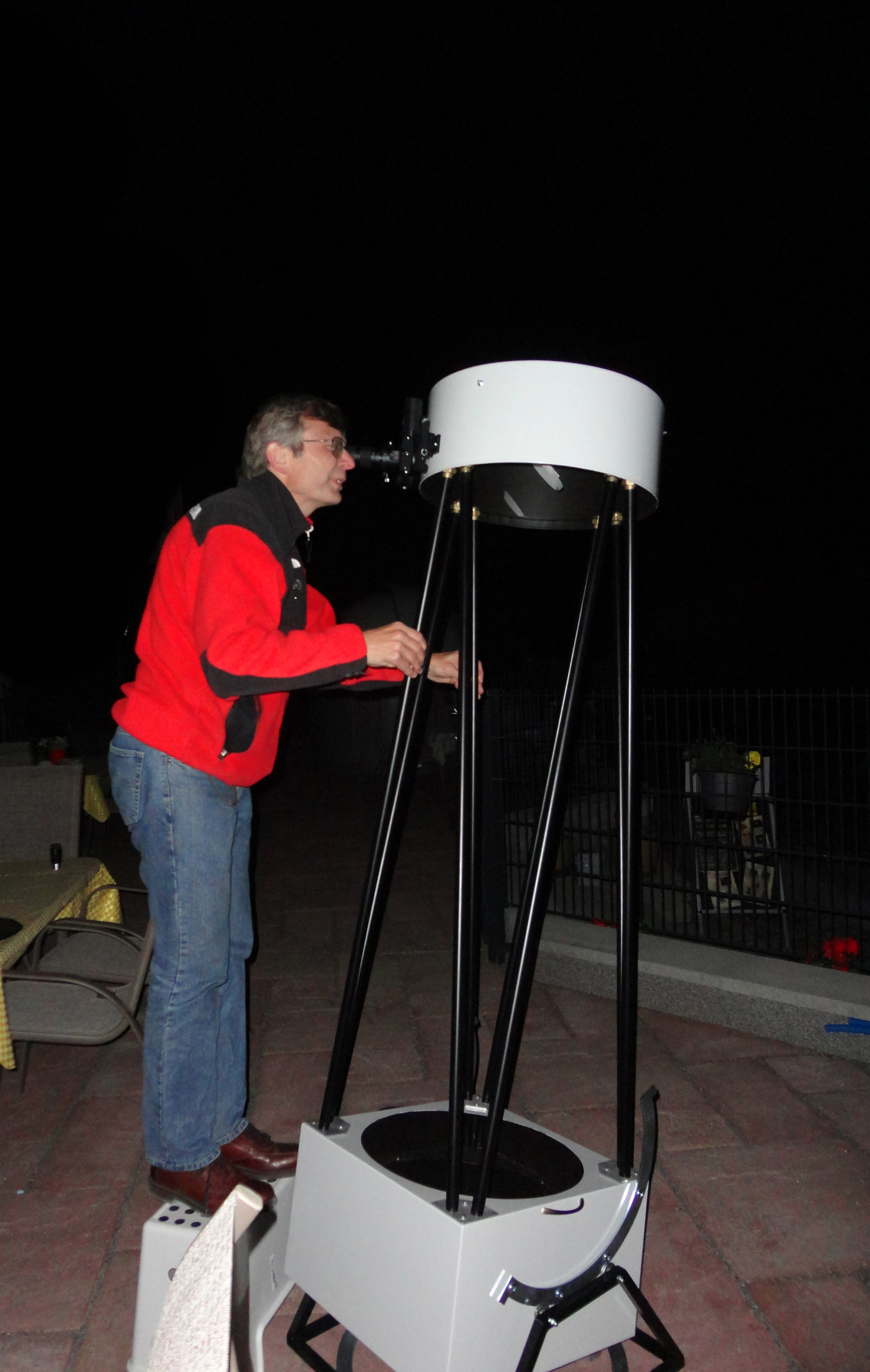
Vaclav Ourednik with the Dobson telescope at Alpine Astrovillage, in the UNESCO Biosphere Reserve "Val Müstair - Swiss National Park", 2014

Vaclav Ourednik (* June 27, 1960 in Prague) is a Swiss natural scientist of Czech origin. His work contributed in important ways to the exploration of developmental and regenerative processes in the nervous system.

== Biography ==
After his studies in microbiology and molecular biology, he turned quickly towards the development and plasticity of the brain. With his wife and scientific collaborator, Dr. Jitka Ourednik, he worked for decades at renowned universities and institutions such as Harvard University and ETH Zürich. Together, they published in high-profile scientific journals like Science, Nature and PNAS (Proceedings of the National Academy of Sciences). Their work described plastic processes governing the development and regeneration of the central nervous system (CNS) and the design of innovative therapeutic approaches towards injury and degenerative disease of the spinal cord and brain. Vaclav Ourednik received various recognitions for his work, among them the Pfizer Prize in Neuroscience as co-author on a Science paper about cortical plasticity and the MJ Fox Foundation Award for his work on neuronal degeneration during Parkinson's disease. In 2005, the scientist couple was invited to present their new ideas and findings during the prestigious Nobel-Forum lectures for young investigators at the Karolinska Institute in Stockholm.

Finally, during the International Year of Astronomy 2009, the two researchers founded the Alpine Astrovillage, a center for astrophotography and stargazing. It is situated in the Eastern Swiss Alps, in the UNESCO Biosphere Reserve "Val Müstair -Swiss National Park". Since then, the two have dedicated themselves exclusively to popular science and educative work and the running of the AAV Center in Switzerland. For their long and internationally recognized work as born Czechs living abroad, the Czech Embassy in Switzerland nominated Vaclav and Jitka Ourednik twice as candidates for the prize Gratias Agit awarded by the Czech Minister of Foreign Affairs.

== Scientific work: Developmental and regenerative neuroscience, selected publications ==
Source: US National Library of the National Institute of Health, PubMed

- (English) "Altered sensory processing in the somatosensory cortex of the mouse mutant barrelless" Science, 1996
- (English) "Neural stem cells display extensive tropism for pathology in adult brain: Evidence from intracranial gliomas, PNAS, 2000
- (English) "Segregation of human neural stem cells in the developing primate forebrain" Science, 2001
- (English) "Neural stem cells display an inherent mechanism for rescuing dysfunctional neurons" Nature Biotechnology, 2002
- (English) "Behavioral improvement in a primate Parkinson's model is associated with multiple homeostatic effects of human neural stem cells" PNAS, 2007
- (English) "Cross-talk between stem cells and the dysfunctional brain is facilitated by manipulating the niche: evidence from an adhesion molecule" Stem Cells, 2009
- (English) "Communication via gap junctions underlies early functional and beneficial interactions between grafted neural stem cells and the host" PNAS, 2010

== Popularization of science: Astrophotography ==
- (German) (English) Homepage of the astrophotography center Alpine Astrovillage
- (German) (English) (French) (Czech) Caelus Edition associated with the AAV Center. It publishes non-fiction books, audioplays and other publications about the cosmos and astrophotography

== Public media: Selected reports ==
- (English) "Unique Telescope Facility Opens In Swiss Biosphere" on line article by Tammy Plotner about the AAVcenter in the UNESCO Biosphere Reserve "Val Müstair - Swiss National Park" in Universe Today (online)
- (German) "Das Alpine Astrovillage - ein Astrofotografie-Zentrum in den Schweizer Alpen" Filmbeitrag des deutschen Fernsehens Bayerischer Rundfunk
- (German) "Starparade Vom Hirn zum Gestirn" Report by Marcel Huwyler about the AAV center and Drs. Jitka and Vaclav Ourednik, Schweizer Illustrierte

== Others ==
- (English) (French) (Italian) UNESCO Biosfere Reserve "Val Müstair - Swiss National Park
