= Paul Ritter (diplomat) =

Swiss diplomat

His Excellency Paul Ritter
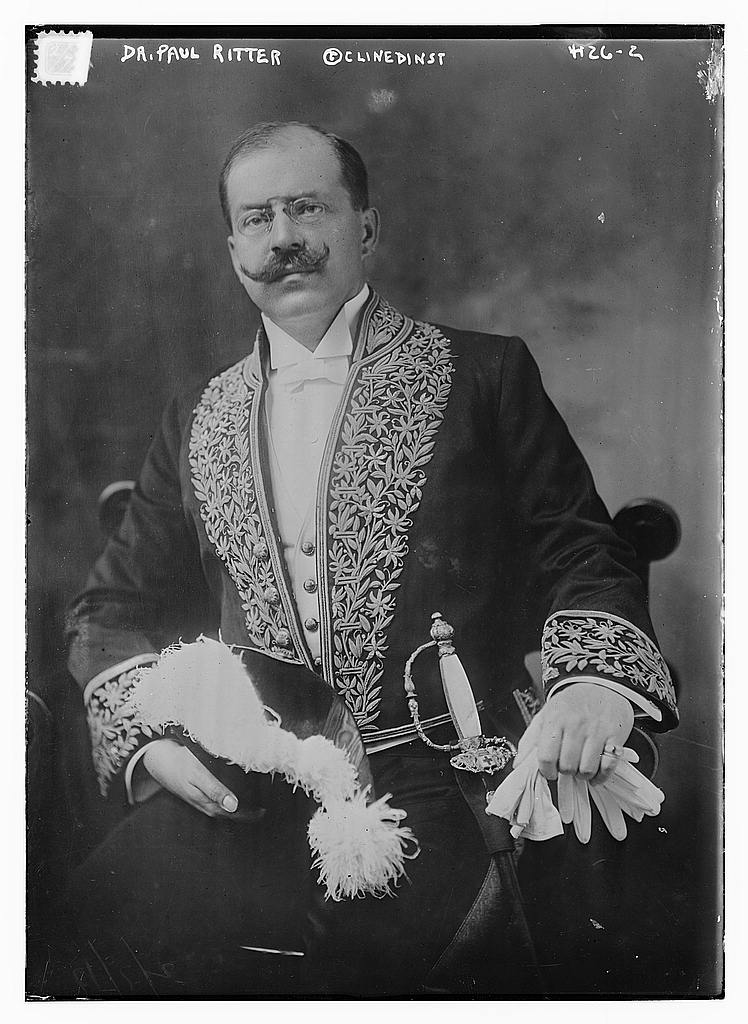
- Ritter c. 1917

Minister of Mission of Switzerland to the United States
- In office 11 June 1909 – 23 July 1917
- President: Adolf Deucher
- Preceded by: Leo Vogel
- Succeeded by: Hans A. Sulzer

Personal details
- Born: Paul Gustav Ritter; 17 November 1865 Basel, Switzerland
- Died: 31 May 1921 (aged 55) Zurich, Switzerland
- Spouse(s): Ida Ringier (m. 1891; died 1899) Louise "Luggi" Reidhaar (m. 1901)
- Children: 2
- Occupation: Jurist, diplomat

Paul Gustav Ritter (17 November 1865 – 31 May 1921) was a Swiss jurist and diplomat who most notably served as Minister of Switzerland to the United States from 1909 to 1917. Ritter held several diplomatic posts in Japan including being the first Minister of Switzerland in Tokyo from 1906 to 1909.

== Early life and education ==
Ritter was born 17 November 1865 in Basel, Switzerland, to Jakob Rudolf Ritter, a businessman, and Regula Ritter (née Stahel), into a Protestant family.

== Diplomatic career ==
He was consul general at Yokohama from 1892 to 1906. He was subsequently appointed Swiss minister resident in Tokyo in 1906. His service in Japan took place during the Meiji period, a time of major political and economic transformation. He then was the Ambassador of Switzerland to Japan.

He was the Ambassador of Switzerland to the United States from 1909 to 1917. He represented the German Empire in the United States when diplomatic relations were severed during World War I on February 3, 1917.

In 1917 he was replaced as ambassador by Hans Sulzer.

He was reassigned to The Hague until he retired in 1920.

== Personal life ==
In approximately 1891, Ritter married firstly to Ida Ringier (died 1899), a daughter of Gottlieb Ringier and Julie Emma Ringier (née Strähl), of the distant Ringier family. His father-in-law served as Chancellor of Switzerland from 1882 to 1909.

In 1901, after the death of his first wife, he secondly married to Louise Helena "Luggi" Reidhaar (1882–1954), a daughter of Dr. Ludwig Reidhaar, a physician. They had two sons;

- Max Gustav Ritter (1902–1982), married Japanese-born Bunko "Harue" Oki, two sons.
- Curt Ritter, married Marianne Niederer (1919–2011), with issue.

Ritter died on 31 May 1921 from apoplexy in Zurich, Switzerland.
