= Hermann Hess (politician) =

Member of the National Council (Switzerland)
- In office 30 November 2015 – 26 November 2017
- Succeeded by: Hansjörg Brunner
- Constituency: Canton of Thurgau

Personal details
- Born: Hermann Hess; 22 December 1951 (age 74) Frauenfeld
- Party: The Liberals
- Education: University of St. Gallen (Licentiate I)
- Occupation: Businessman, real estate developer, politician

Military service
- Branch/service: Swiss Armed Forces
- Years of service: 1978–2001
- Rank: Korporal (Corporal)

Hermann Hess (born 22 December 1951 in Frauenfeld) is a Swiss businessman, real estate developer and politician who served on the National Council (Switzerland) from 2015 to 2017 for The Liberals. He previously served on the Grand Council of Thurgau from 2012 to 2015. Handelszeitung estimated his net worth at CHF 223 million in 2023 (approximately $250 million).

== Early life and education ==
Hess was born 22 December 1951 in Frauenfeld, Thurgau, the second of four children, to Hermann Hess Sr. (died 1970), a textile industrialist, and Eva Hess (née Wegmann; 1922–2019), a secondary school teacher. He had an older sister, Barbara Hess, and two younger sisters, Cordula Hess and Ulrike Hess.

After his father committed suicide in 1970, his mother took the responsibility for ESCO, a textile manufacturing company with over 1,000 employees, which her husband had inherited in the fourth generation. Hess completed the secondary schools in Amriswil and Frauenfeld. Between 1970 and 1976, Hess pursued Piano studies, to become a professional pianist. Ultimately he studied Economics at the University of St. Gallen graduating in 1979.

== Career ==
In 1979, he assumed the management of the family business, ESCO, in 1979, taking over from his mother, who had been widowed early. Between 1991 and 1993, he withdrew from the clothing business and began operating in the real estate sector. In 1993, he established the Hess Investment Group as the sole shareholder, repurposing former commercial properties.

== Politics ==
Hess had been a member of The Liberals since about 1985/86. He served on the Grand Council of Thurgau from 2012 to 2015. During the 2015 Swiss federal election, he was elected into National Council (Switzerland), where he served between 2015 and 2017. He was succeeded by Hansjörg Brunner.

== Personal life ==
Hess is separated and has two children. He resides in Amriswil.
