= Ellen Ringier =

Swiss publisher (1951–2025)

- Born: Ellen Renée Lüthy; 7 December 1951; Lucerne, Switzerland
- Died: 19 March 2025 (aged 73); Zurich, Switzerland
- Citizenship: Swiss
- Occupations: Philanthropist, socialite, publisher, film producer, attorney
- Spouse: Michael Ringier (m. 1976)
- Children: 2

Ellen Renée Ringier (née Lüthy; 7 December 1951 – 19 March 2025) was a Swiss philanthropist, socialite, publisher, film producer, and attorney. She was married to Michael Ringier, who is the chairman of the Ringier publishing company, and a member of the Ringier family.

== Early life and education ==
Ellen Renée Lüthy was born 7 December 1951 in Lucerne, Switzerland to Viktor Lüthy (1924–1998), a furrier, art collector and patron, and Harriet Lüthy (née Hock). Her mother was born to an Austrian mother and English father who all fled to London, England during World War II. She had two younger sisters; Janet Briner (née Lüthy) and Kay Lüthy.

Ringier was born into a well-established family. The Lüthy family, was originally from Wohlen, Aargau, and settled in Lucerne at the end of the 19th century becoming active in fur manufacturing and trading at the Weinmarkt. Her great-great-grandfather was Rudolf-Alois Kauffmann, colloquially Alois Kauffmann (1804–1889), who was a butcher of Austrian descent, who became a real estate speculator and landowner. His estate was valued at 1,109,676.86 Swiss Francs (adjusted for inflation roughly 310 Million Swiss Francs in 2025).

She studied law at the University of Zurich completing her Juris Doctor (Promotion) under Manfred Rehbinder in 1980. Subsequently, she started working as an auditor at the regional court.

== Activities ==
Ringier was committed to the areas of culture, anti-racism, women, and scouting. She worked with the Humanitas Foundation and served as the president of the board of the Museum Haus Konstruktiv in Zurich for 13 years. In 2001, she founded the Elternsein Foundation, which publishes the parenting magazine Fritz + Fränzi. According to Ringier, this magazine aims to raise awareness of parenting tasks among both parents and the general population. Additionally, she was a co-producer of the documentary #Female Pleasure directed by Barbara Miller.

== Personal life and death ==
In 1976, she married Michael Ringier (born 1949), the youngest son of Hans Ringier (1906–2003) and Eva Ringier (née Landolt; 1914–1996). Hans Ringier was then the sole proprietor of the Ringier publishing company and member of the Ringier family. They had two daughters, Lilly (born 1991) and Sophie (born 1993).

They resided in Küsnacht on Lake Zurich. She died after a serious illness in Zurich, on 19 March 2025, at the age of 73.
