= Jitka Ourednik =

Czech natural scientist

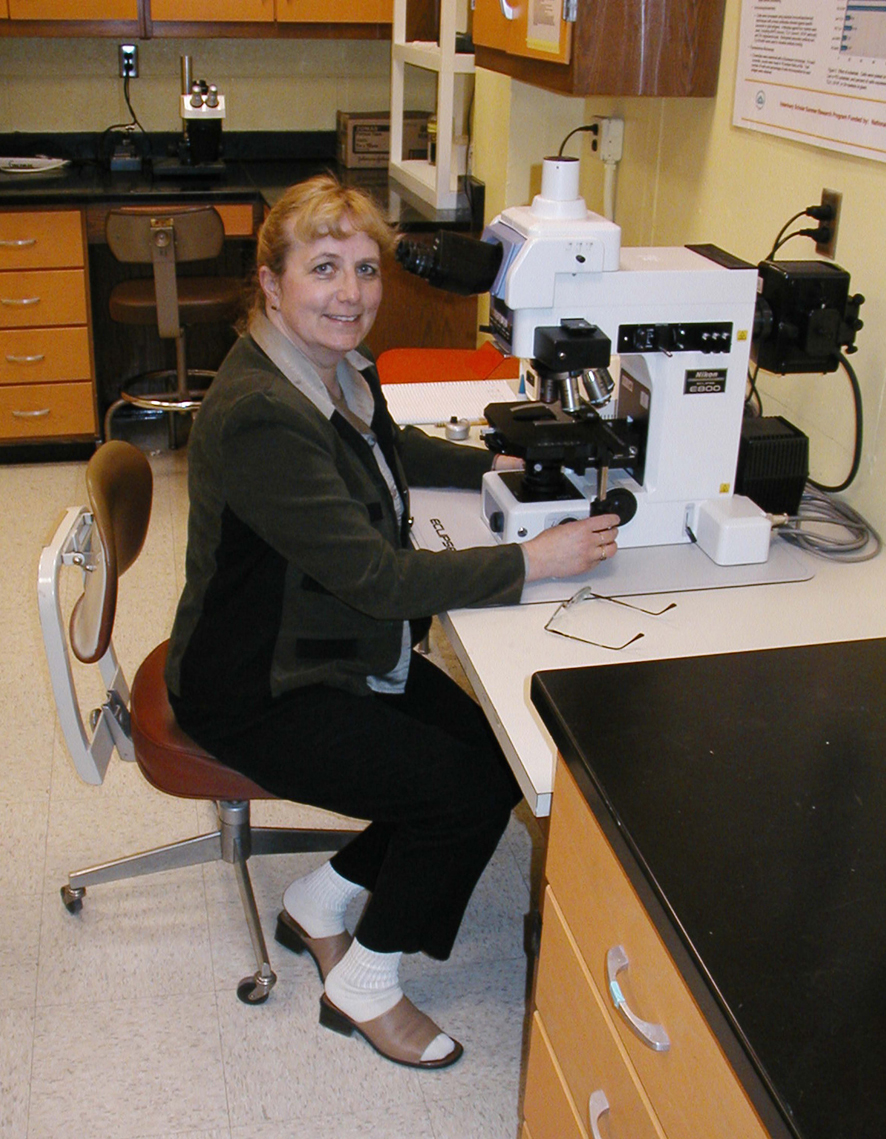
Jitka Ourednik in the lab of Harvard Medical School, Boston, 2002

Jitka Ourednik born Hanzíková (* April 19, 1955 in Prague) is a natural scientist of Czech origin now living in Switzerland. She is a daughter of the Czech contemporary sculptor Stanislav Hanzik.

== Biography ==
Her work contributed in important ways to the exploration of developmental and regenerative processes in the nervous system. With her husband and scientific collaborator, Dr. Vaclav Ourednik, she worked for over three decades at renowned universities and institutions such as Harvard University and ETH Zürich. Together, they published in high-profile scientific journals like Science, Nature and PNAS (Proceedings of the National Academy of Sciences). Their work described plastic processes governing the development and regeneration of the central nervous system (CNS) and the design of innovative therapeutic approaches towards injury and degenerative disease of the spinal cord and brain. During the International Year of Astronomy 2009, the two researchers founded the Alpine Astrovillage, a center for astrophotography and stargazing. It is situated in the Eastern Swiss Alps, in the UNESCO Biosphere Reserve Val Müstair-Swiss National Park. For her scientific, educative, and popularizing work, Jitka Ourednik received many credits and recognitions. She organized scientific congresses and chaired talk sessions during national and international events. Her neuroscientific research focused on the induction of then still unexplored regenerative capacities of the CNS in relation to transplantation of embryonic neural tissue and of neural stem cells. In 2005, the scientist couple was invited to present their new ideas and findings during the prestigious Nobel-Forum lectures for young investigators at the Karolinska Institute in Stockholm. Since 2009, the two have dedicated themselves exclusively to their popular science and educative work and the running of their AAV Center in Switzerland. For her long and internationally recognized work as a born Czech living abroad, the Czech Embassy in Switzerland nominated Jitka Ourednik already twice as candidate for the prize Gratias Agit.

== Scientific work: Developmental and regenerative neuroscience, selected publications ==
Source: US National Library of the National Institute of Health, PubMed

- (English) "Do foetal neural grafts induce repair by the injured juvenile neocortex?" 1993, Neuroreport, 1993
- (English) "Segregation of human neural stem cells in the developing primate forebrain" 2001, Science, 2001
- (English) "Neural stem cells display an inherent mechanism for rescuing dysfunctional neurons" 2002, Nature Biotechnology
- (English) "Functional recovery following traumatic spinal cord injury mediated by a unique polymer scaffold seeded with neural stem cells" 2002, PNAS
- (English) "Graft/host relationships in the developing and regenerating CNS of mammals" 2005, Annals of the New York Academy of Sciences
- (English) "Grafted neural stem cells shield the host environment from oxidative stress" 2005, Annals of the New York Academy of Sciences
- (English) "Behavioral improvement in a primate Parkinson's model is associated with multiple homeostatic effects of human neural stem cells" 2007, PNAS
- (English) "Cross-talk between stem cells and the dysfunctional brain is facilitated by manipulating the niche: evidence from an adhesion molecule" 2009, Stem Cells

== Popularization of science: Astrophotography ==
- (German) (English) Homepage of the astrophotography center Alpine Astrovillage
- (German) (English) (French) (Czech) Caelus Edition associated with the AAV Center. It publishes non-fiction books, audioplays and other publications about the cosmos and astrophotography

== Public media: Selected reports ==
- (Czech) "Od neuronů ke hvězdám" (in Engl. "From Neurons to Stars") Respekt, Report by Martin Uhlíř, May 2017
- (English) "Unique Telescope Facility Opens In Swiss Biosphere" on line article by Tammy Plotner about the AAVcenter in the UNESCO Biosphere Reserve "Val Müstair - Swiss National Park" in Universe Today (online)
- (German) "Das Alpine Astrovillage - ein Astrofotografie-Zentrum in den Schweizer Alpen" A movie feature about the AAV center in the German TV, Bayerischer Rundfunk
- (German) "Starparade Vom Hirn zum Gestirn" Report by Marcel Huwyler about the AAV center and Drs. Jitka and Vaclav Ourednik, Schweizer Illustrierte

== Others ==
- (English) (French) (Italian) UNESCO Biosfere Reserve "Val Müstair - Swiss National Park
