= Michael Ringier =

Swiss publisher (born 1949)

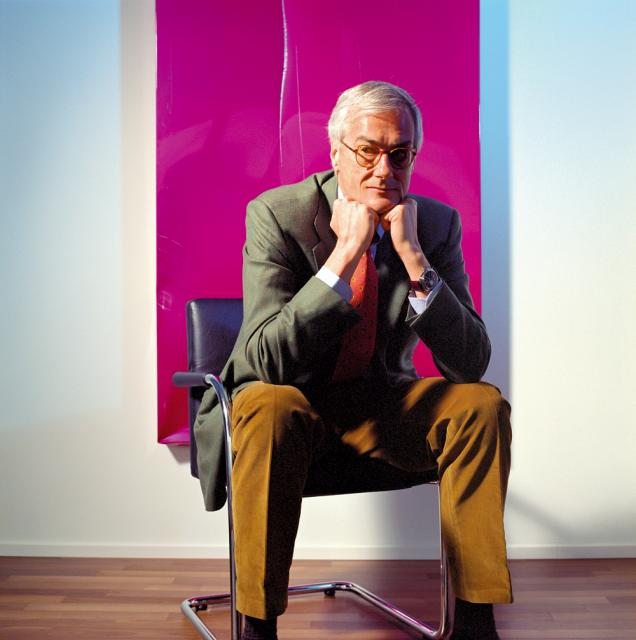
- Born: Michael Ringier; 30 March 1949 (age 76); Zofingen, Switzerland
- Education: University of St. Gallen (1970–1972)
- Occupation(s): Publisher, Chairman of Ringier Holding AG
- Spouse: Ellen Ringier (m. 1976; died 2025)
- Children: Two adopted daughters
- Family: Ringier family
- Website: www.ringier.com

Michael Ringier (born 30 March 1949) is a Swiss businessman, publisher and art collector. He has served as chairman of the board of directors of Ringier, a leading Swiss media company, since 2003. He is a prominent member of the Ringier family.

== Early life ==
Ringier was born 30 March 1949 in Zofingen, Switzerland, the youngest of four children, to Hans Ringier (1906-2003), publisher, and Eva Ringier (née Landolt; 1914-1996). His siblings are; Christoph Ringier (born 1941), Evelyn Lingg (née Ringier; formerly Bargezi; born 1942) and Annette Ringier (1944-2020).

His father was the sole heir and proprietor to the Ringier media company. The Ringier family is of French Huguenot descent from Nîmes. His ancestors settled in Zofingen in 1557 and became active in the printing and publishing business in 1831.

Ringier was raised in Zofingen and attended the local schools. From 1970 to 1972 he attended University of St. Gallen but did not graduate.

== Career ==
In 1973, he began to work as a journalist for the Münchner Abendzeitung. After attending courses at a journalism school and editorial stations in his family's media company, Ringier completed a trainee program at Heinrich Bauer Verlag in Hamburg in 1976/77. He then worked for the business editorial staff of the Stern and conceived (also for Gruner + Jahr) the magazin impulse. In the Cologne editorial department, he headed the department of "Business Administration and Business" from 1980 onwards.

In 1983, he returned to Switzerland, where he took over the responsibility for New Media and the German market in the Ringier AG. In 1985, Michael Ringier was CEO of Ringier AG. In 1991, as Chairman of the Board of Directors, he took over sole responsibility for the company. In 1997, he resigned as Chairman of the Board and took over the operational leadership of Ringier AG, as delegate of the board of directors. He also took over publishing management of the publisher. In 2003, Ringier became Chairman of Ringier Holding AG.

In January 2018, Ringier announced at the Group Executive Board meeting that Marc Walder had become an equity partner holding a stake of 10%.

== Personal life ==
Ringier was married to the late law graduate Ellen Ringier (née Lüthy; 1951–2025) and has two adopted daughters. Ringier is considered a proven art collector with a collection of more than 4,000 works of contemporary art and lives in a modern villa on Lake Zurich. He likes to spend his holidays in his holiday home in Engadin. Ringier likes to jog and is a passionate tennis and golf player.

== Other activities ==
- Swiss Institute Contemporary Art New York, Member of the Board of Trustees (since 2016)

== Controversy ==
In November 2017, Ringier’s name appeared in press reports in connection with payments made in 2015 and 2016 to Beatrix Ruf, the then artistic director of the Stedelijk Museum Amsterdam, which lead to her resignation. Ringier, a former employer of Ruf, confirmed paying a departing “thank you gift” in installments over 2015 and 2016 for her successfully increasing the value of his personal collection.

In January 2022, Michael Ringier dealt with accusations, arising out of Ringier’s CEO Marc Walder’s statements at a board meeting the previous year, of allegedly pro-government Covid coverage which escalated to allegations that journalism at Ringier was “carried out according to instructions,” marking them as “an absolutely malicious defamation of the daily work of many competent and extremely serious journalists at Ringier.”

In November 2022, it was reported that Michael Ringier and Marc Walder, as well as Ringier-AG, had started legal action against the finance news portal “Inside Paradeplatz GmbH” and its operator and owner Lukas Hässig, for violation of personal rights.

== Literature ==
- Michael Ringier Biography, in the Munzinger-Archiv
- Ringen um Ringier, Über die Kunst der Digitalisierung in einem Schweizer Medienkonzern, René Lüchinger, Steidl, Göttingen 2019, ISBN 978-3-95829-588-9
