= Betty Bossi =

Swiss cookbook publisher

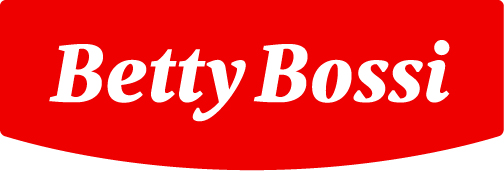

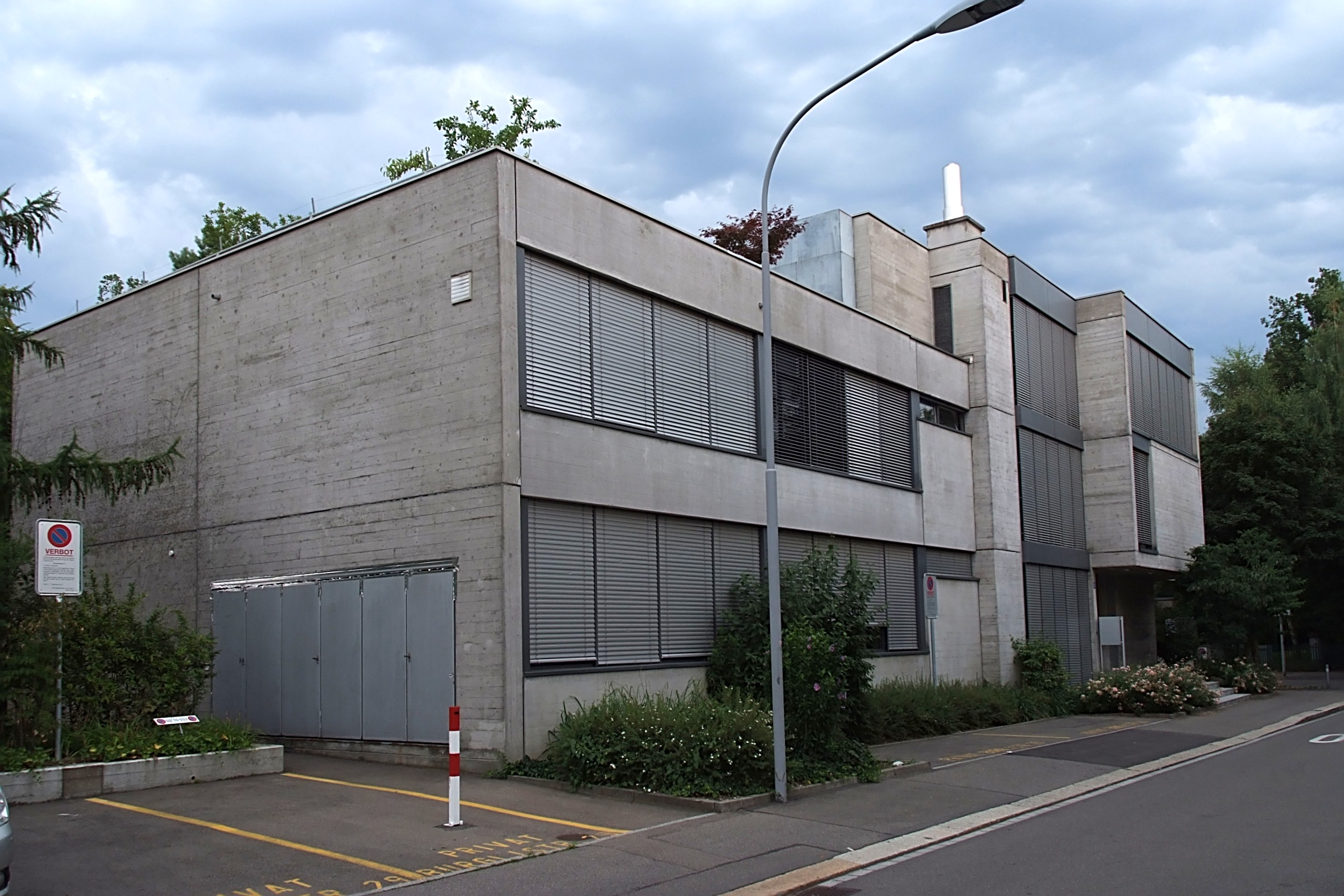
- Betty Bossi head office
- Type: Subsidiary
- Industry: Publishing
- Parent: Coop Group
- Website: www.bettybossi.ch

Betty Bossi is a Swiss cookbook publisher. The Betty Bossi brand published various cookbooks and newsletters, and sponsored various cooking contests. Shirley Eu-Wong, author of Culture shock!: Switzerland, mentioned that Betty Bossi's "recipe booklets can be found in almost any Swiss-Romande kitchen cabinet." The brand is operated by Betty Bossi AG/Betty Bossi SA, headquartered in Zurich, which is owned by the Coop group.

== History ==
The name originates from "Betty Bossi", a fictional character created in the mid-1950s, taking inspiration from Betty Crocker. Gary Genosko, author of "Better than butter: Margarine and simulation," said that the character "Betty Bossi" was "a kind of Franco-Swiss Betty Crocker". Bossi was said to be the inventor of "tartines," a bread-and-butter snack.

From 1956 the oil and fat producer Astra published the Betty Bossi Post as free information for consumers. In 1977 it became the Betty Bossi Zeitung. Fachzeitschrift für Kochen und Haushalten (Betty Bossi newspaper: journal for cooking and housekeeping), which was called Betty Bossi from 1993; in 2005 it had a circulation of 900,000 in German and French, mainly by subscription. The first cookbook appeared in 1973, followed by two or three new ones every year. Cooking and household appliances were also sold, and a cooking school was run. Betty Bossi Verlag AG was founded in 1977 within the Swiss Unilever group and was taken over by Ringier in 1995; in 1999 it had total sales of 65 million francs. From 2001 Betty Bossi was owned half by the media company Ringier and half by the retailer Coop, which from then on sold products under the Betty Bossi label. The publisher produced the cooking program al dente, broadcast on Swiss German television from 2001 to 2010 and on French-speaking Swiss television from 2005 to 2017 (from 2011 only with the publisher's financial participation). The widely used cookbooks and other successful products have had a lasting influence on Swiss households.

For a period of time around 2003, Swiss International Air Lines offered a buy on board service in economy class on European flights generally 70 minutes or longer, with menu items from Betty Bossi.

In 2012 the company was purchased outright by Coop, which had previously taken a 50% stake in 2001.

After its initial investment Coop launched a range of Betty Bossi-branded convenience foods in its stores, which as of 2018 had expanded to around 1,400 lines.

In 2025 a movie "Hallo Betty" came out which describes the story of Emmi Creola, the advertising copywriter who created Betti.

== See also ==
- Swiss cuisine

== Notes ==
This article incorporates text from a free content work. Licensed under CC-BY SA. Text taken from Betty Bossi, Markus Lischer, Historical Dictionary of Switzerland.
