= Alpine Astrovillage Lü-Stailas =

Alpine Astrovillage
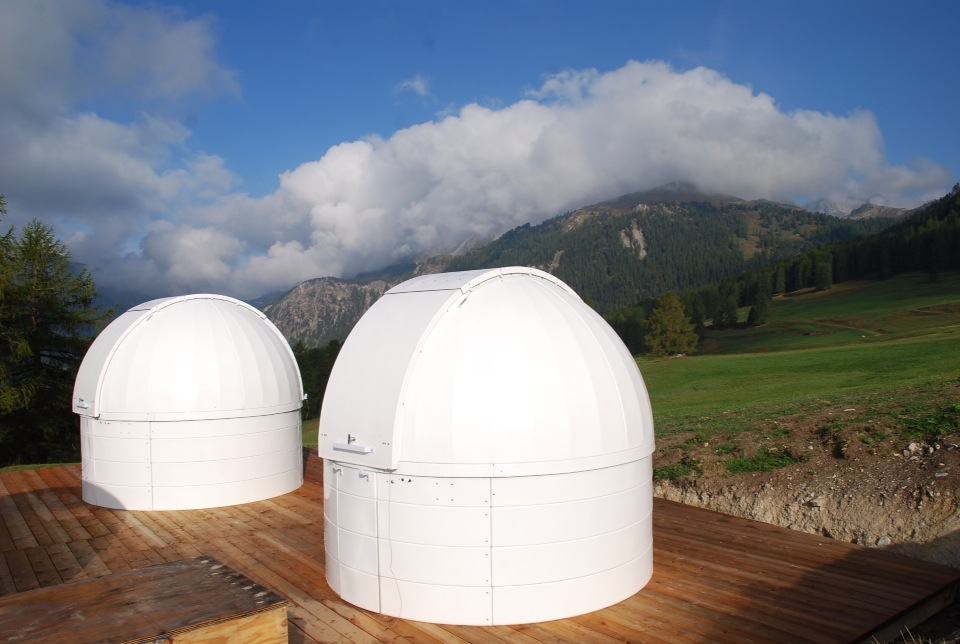
- Two of the four astronomical domes used by the Alpine Center
- Organization: private educational facility, opened to public
- Location: Val Müstair, Canton Graubuenden
- Coordinates: 46°37′20″N 10°21′49″E
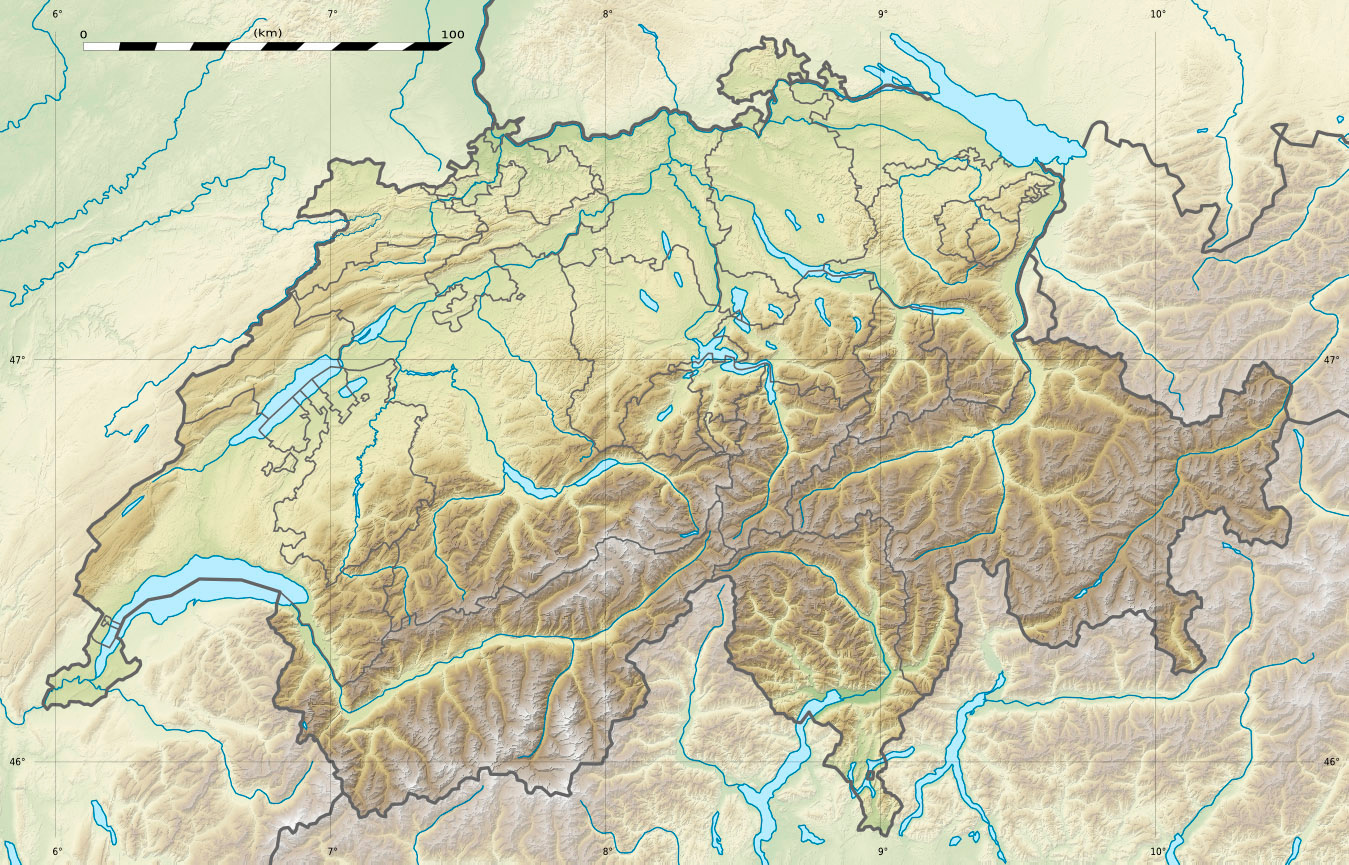
- Location of Alpine Astrovillage

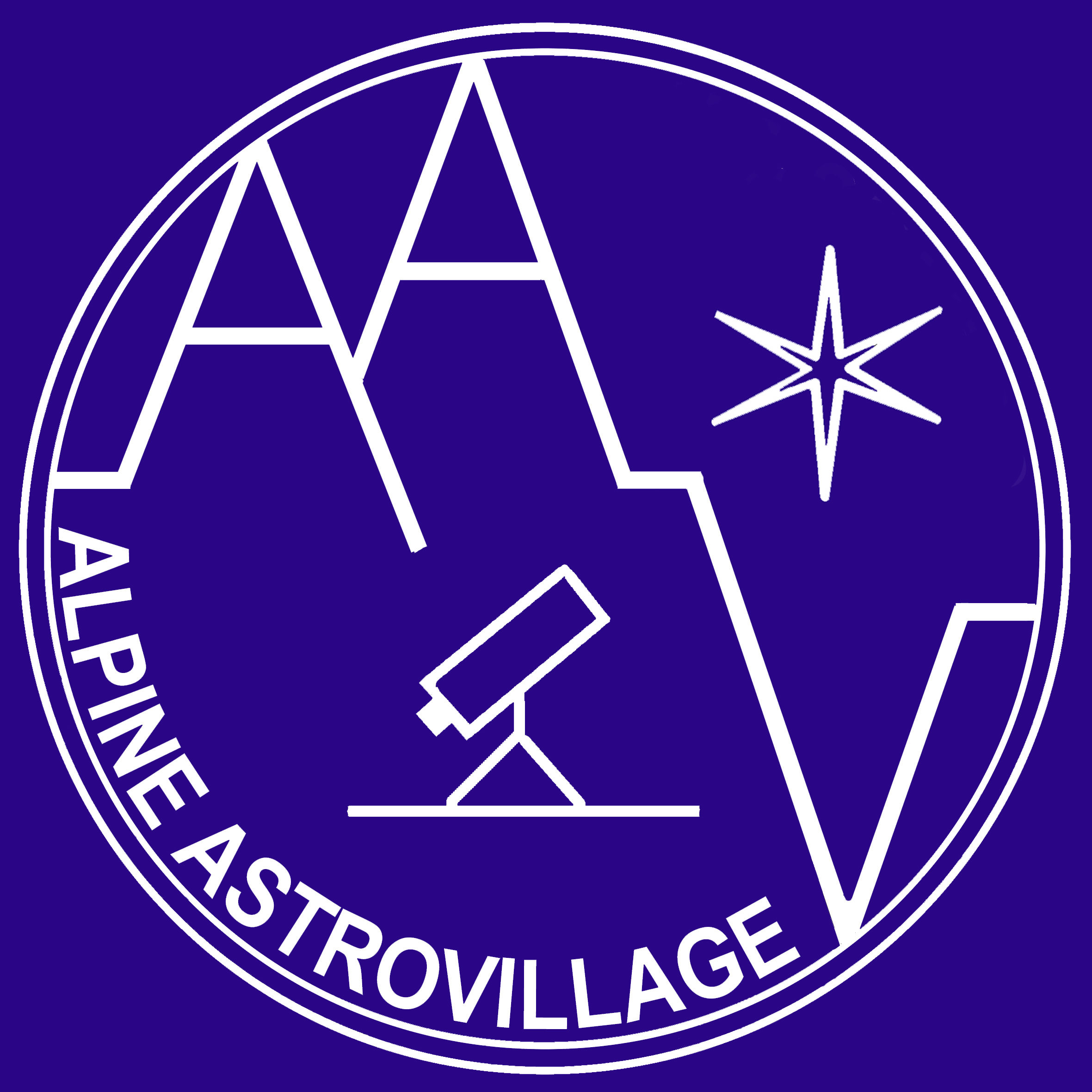
Alpine Astrovillage – Logo

Alpine Astrovillage (AAV) is a center for astrophotography and stargazing in the eastern Swiss Alps, high above the valley floor of the Val Müstair in the canton Graubünden. It was founded by Drs. Vaclav & Jitka Ourednik during the International Year of Astronomy 2009. The complete name is Alpine Astrovillage Lü-Stailas (for “star light” in the Romansh language of the Canton). With its geographic location at an altitude above 1,900 metres (6,200 ft) and an exquisite sky quality with minimal light pollution, AAV is a unique place in Central Europe for all astronomical purposes. The program includes multi-day courses in astrophotography and sky observation. In collaboration with schools, AAV offers students the possibility to accomplish, under competent guidance, the practical parts of their matura (or Bachelor) or Masters projects.

AAV also organizes and supervises astrophotography trips to the darkest places on Earth, including visits to the most famous and biggest professional observatories. Meanwhile, the Center enjoys, thanks to its educative activities, great national and international popularity and respect. For years, it has been known as an Erlebnisperle des Kantons Graubünden (Destination Pearl of the canton Graubünden). With its activity, the Center contributes in an important way to the preservation of the last dark sky oases on the planet for the coming generations.

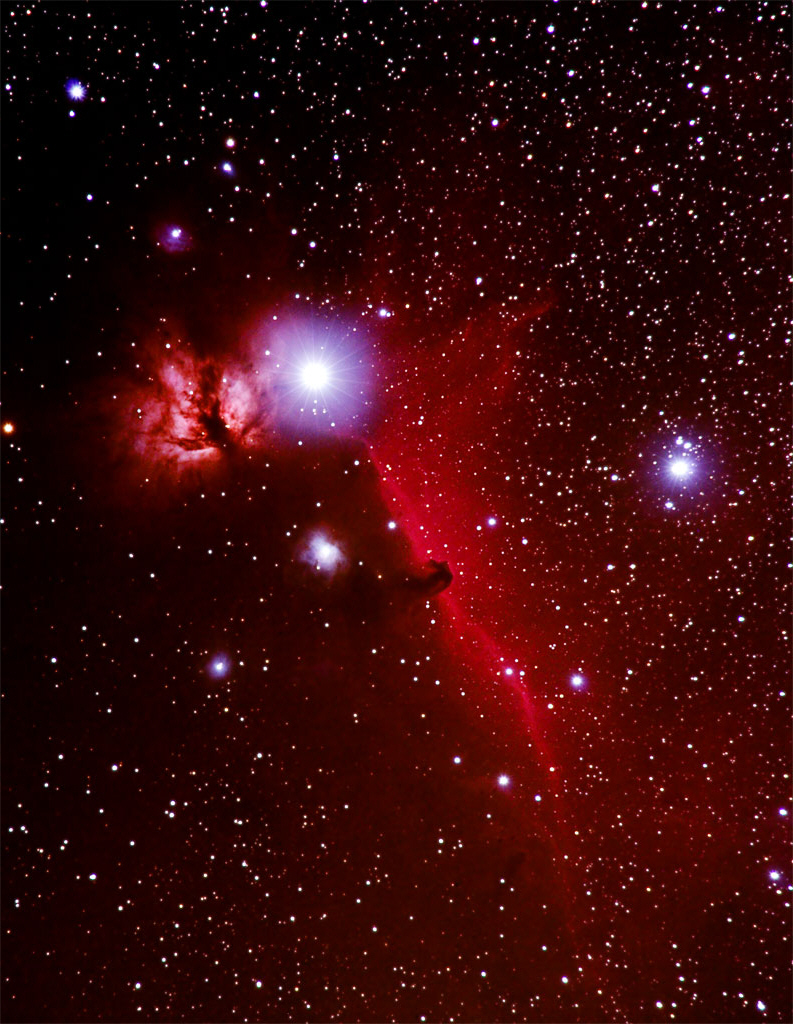
Horsehead Nebula (Barnard 33), Foto: Alpine Astrovillage Lü-Stailas

== See also ==
- List of astronomical observatories
- List of astronomical societies
