= Ringier family =

Family in the Swiss media industry

Ringier family Régnier, Rinnier
- Current region: Switzerland, United Kingdom and Spain
- Origin: Nîmes, France
- Founded: 1527, Zofingen; 499 years ago
- Founder: Jean Ringier
- Connected families: Bühlmann family Dimmler family Bertschy family

The Ringier family (/ˈrɪndʒɪər/ RIN-jeer) is a prominent Swiss political and business family recognized for its substantial contributions to the media and publishing sectors. The family's lineage in the media industry dates back to the establishment of Ringier in 1833 by Johann Rudolf Ringier.

This enterprise has since evolved into one of Switzerland's leading media conglomerates, engaging in a diverse array of publications, including newspapers, magazines, and digital media platforms. The family is considered one of the wealthiest families in Switzerland, with an estimated net worth ranging from 1,5 to 2 billion Swiss francs estimated by Bilanz.

== History ==
The history of the Ringier family begins in 1527 with the establishment of a lineage through a cooper from Nîmes who gained citizenship in Zofingen, Switzerland. The family quickly became influential, particularly in the fields of book printing and publishing, with significant contributions to local governance and politics from the 18th century onward.

A strong religious foundation characterized the family, with numerous members serving as Reformed clergy, particularly within the Bernese territory. Engagement in proto-industrial activities, notably in textile manufacturing, marked a shift toward commerce in the 18th century, alongside contributions to architectural endeavors such as the design of the late Baroque town hall in Zofingen.

Throughout the 19th century, family members played active roles in regional and national politics, contributing to civic design and governance. In 1833, the establishment of a printing company marked the beginning of a successful business venture, which evolved into the largest printing and publishing house in Switzerland by the late 19th century.In the following decades, the company expanded into an international multimedia corporation, adapting to changes in the industry and continuing the family legacy of influence in both business and civic life.

== Members ==
=== Descendants of Johann Rudolf Ringier (1803-1874) ===
- Johann Rudolf Ringier (1803–1874) (m. 1835) Maria Sutermeister (1809–)
  - Franz Emil Ringier (1837–1898)
    - Paul August Ringier (1876-1960) (m. 1905) Emma "Emmy" Steiner (1899–1978)
      - Hans Ringier (1906–2003) (m. 1940) Eva Landolt (1914–1996)
        - Christoph Ringier (born 1941)
        - Evelyn Ringier (born 1942), married firstly Bargezi, secondly Lingg
          - Roman Bargezi
          - Robin Lingg (born 1977)
        - Annette Ringier (1944–2020), never married
        - Michael Ringier (born 1949) (m.) Ellen Renée Lüthy (1951–2025)
      - Margrit Ida Ringier (1906–1987) (m.) Carl Egon Dimmler, colloquially C.E. Dimmler (1905–1965)
        - Sonja Rosmarie Dimmler (1934–2020) (m.) Giuseppe Serafini
          - Fabrizio Serafini
            - Francesca
            - Elisabetta
          - Nadja Serafini
            - Imran
            - Noor
            - Danish
        - Carl Dimmler
        - Ralph Dimmler (1938–2020) (m.) Janine Ermel
          - Monica Dimmler (m.) Markus Bühlmann
            - Mischa Bühlmann
            - Noel Bühlmann
          - Stefan Dimmler (m.) Claudia
            - Cristina Dimmler
            - Kaya Dimmler
            - Lou Dimmler
            - May Dimmler
          - Elisabeth Dimmler (m.) Schintzig
      - Rita Ringier (m.) Herbert Bertschy (1901–1979)
        - Ronald Bertschy
        - Alexander Robert Bertschy (1941–2022) (m.) Jean Elizabeth Sutcliffe
          - Karin Bertschy (m.) Andreas "Andy" Hopp
            - Alexandra Hopp (born 2001)
            - Timothy Andrew Hopp (born 2003)
          - Paul Bertschy (o-o) Juliana Zweifel
            - Melek Bertschy
            - Namik Bertschy
            - Anouk Bertschy
          - James Franklin Bertschy, nicked James Leeds (o-o) Alexandra Petrova
            - Zhanna Bertschy
            - Dylan Bertschy
            - Xenia Bertschy
            - Ellie Bertschy
      - Ilse Gertrud "Pupeli" Ringier (1915–1969) (m.) Frank A. Lorang
        - Suzanne Ilse Lorang (m.) Gimenez
          - Nuria Giménez Lorang (born 1976)
