= Leo Vogel =

Swiss attorney and diplomat (1863–1946)

His Excellency Leo Vogel
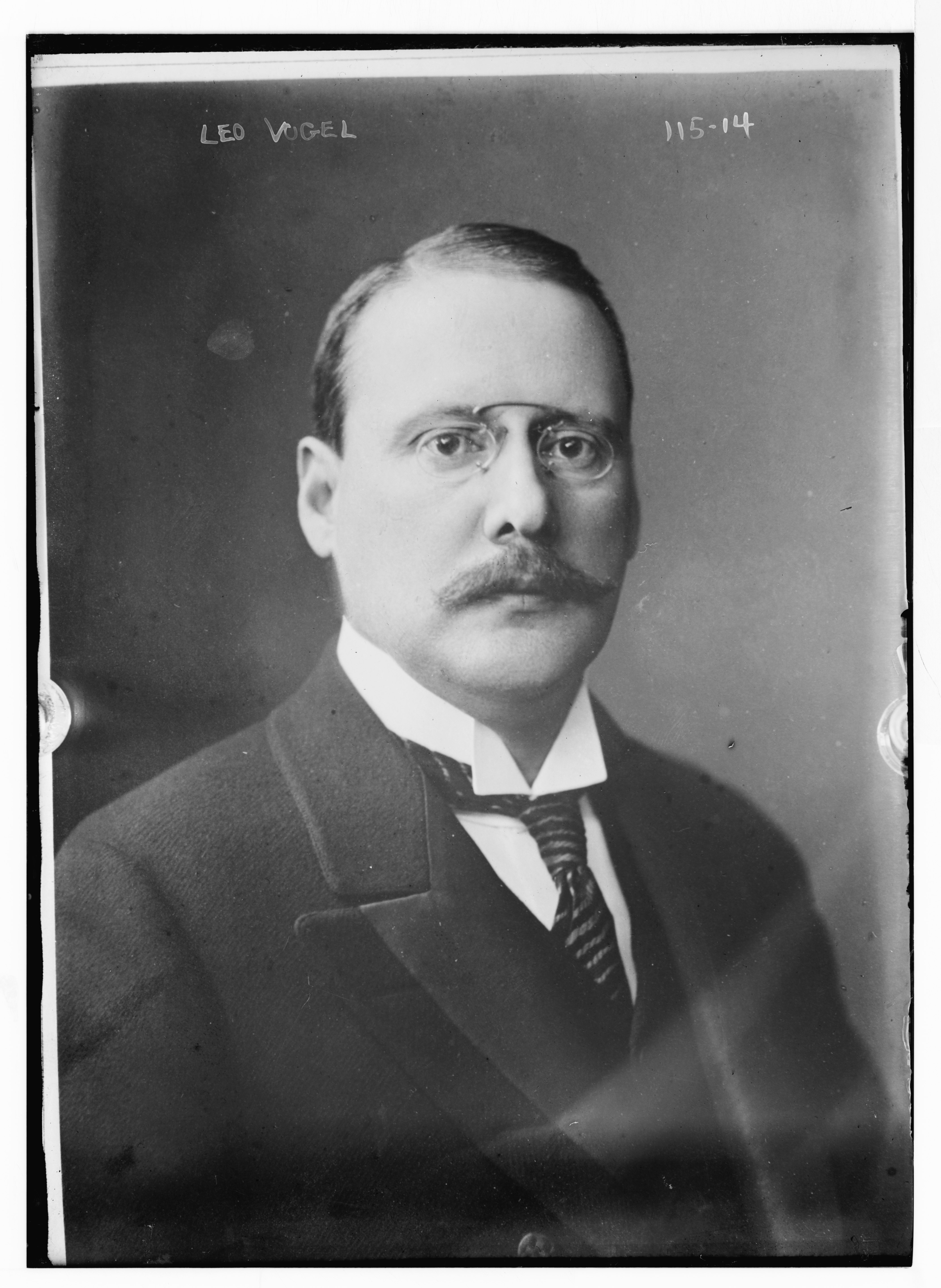
- Official portrait, Library of Congress c. 1905

Minister of Mission of Switzerland to the United States
- In office 11 October 1904 – 31 May 1909
- President: Robert Comtesse
- Preceded by: Fernand du Martheray
- Succeeded by: Paul Ritter

Personal details
- Born: Leo Emil Friedrich Vogel; 23 October 1863 Rio de Janeiro, Brazil
- Died: 13 February 1946 (aged 82) Horw, Switzerland
- Spouse: Elisabeth "Lisbeth" Wille (m. 1909)
- Occupation: Attorney, diplomat

Leo Emil Friedrich Vogel colloquially Leo Vogel (23 October 1863 – 13 March 1946) was a Brazilian-born Swiss attorney and diplomat who most notably served as Swiss Minister to the United States from 1904 to 1909.

== Early life and education ==
Vogel was born 23 October 1863 in Rio de Janeiro, Brazil, the older of two sons, to Johannes Vogel, a merchant, and Wilhelmine Vogel (née Plagge), both originally from Germany. He had one younger brother; Dr. Robert Vogel (1869–1956), a physician in Basel. He studied jurisprudence at the University of Zurich, Strasbourg, Berlin and Vienna completing his Juris Doctor in 1889.

== Career ==
After completing his doctorate, Vogel entered the Federal Department of Foreign Affairs (then the Federal Department of Political Affairs) in 1891. Until 1904, he held a variety of positions, in Rome, Washington D.C. and Berlin. On 11 October 1904, Vogel was appointed Swiss Minister to the United States, in Washington D.C. He held this position until 1909, resigning due to health reasons. Later he returned to the Federal Department of Foreign Affairs due to financial problems.

== Personal life ==
In 1909, Vogel married Elisabeth "Lisbeth" Wille, a daughter of John Wille. They did not have children. Vogel died on 13 March 1946 at his Stutz estate in Horw, Switzerland.
