= Handelszeitung =

Swiss weekly business newspaper

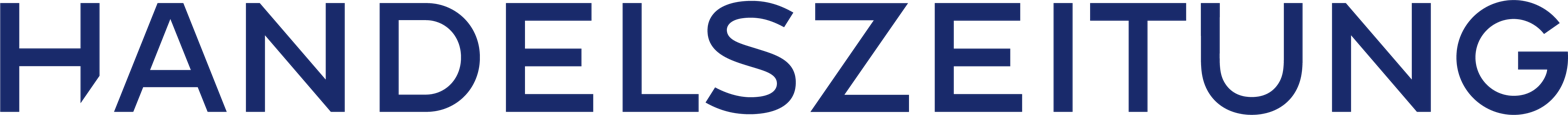
- Type: Weekly newspaper
- Owner: Ringier
- Founded: 1861
- Language: German
- Headquarters: Zurich
- Country: Switzerland
- Website: www.handelszeitung.ch

The Handelszeitung is a German-language Swiss weekly newspaper. The paper was established in 1861 being the oldest business newspaper in Switzerland. It is controlled by Ringier. The paper is published on Wednesdays and has a liberal political leaning.

Its head office is in Zürich. As of 2026, the editor-in-chief of the paper is Markus Diem Meier. In 2019 the circulation of Handelszeitung was 37.500 copies.
