= Ringier =

Media group in Switzerland

Ringier Group
- Type: Stock corporation
- Industry: Media
- Founded: 1833; 193 years ago
- Headquarters: Zofingen, Switzerland
- Key people: Michael Ringier, Chairman; Marc Walder, CEO since 2012
- Revenue: CHF 918.9 million (2023)
- Owner: Ringier family
- Number of employees: 6'571 (2023)
- Website: ringier.com

Ringier Group (German: [ʀɪŋieɪ] RING-ee-ay) is a media group operating in multiple countries with over 6,500 employees. Founded in 1833, the family-owned business manages media brands across print and digital, TV and radio, and is active in the entertainment and digital marketplace sectors. The headquarters of Ringier AG is located in Zofingen, Aargau, with additional offices in Zurich and Lausanne.

== History ==
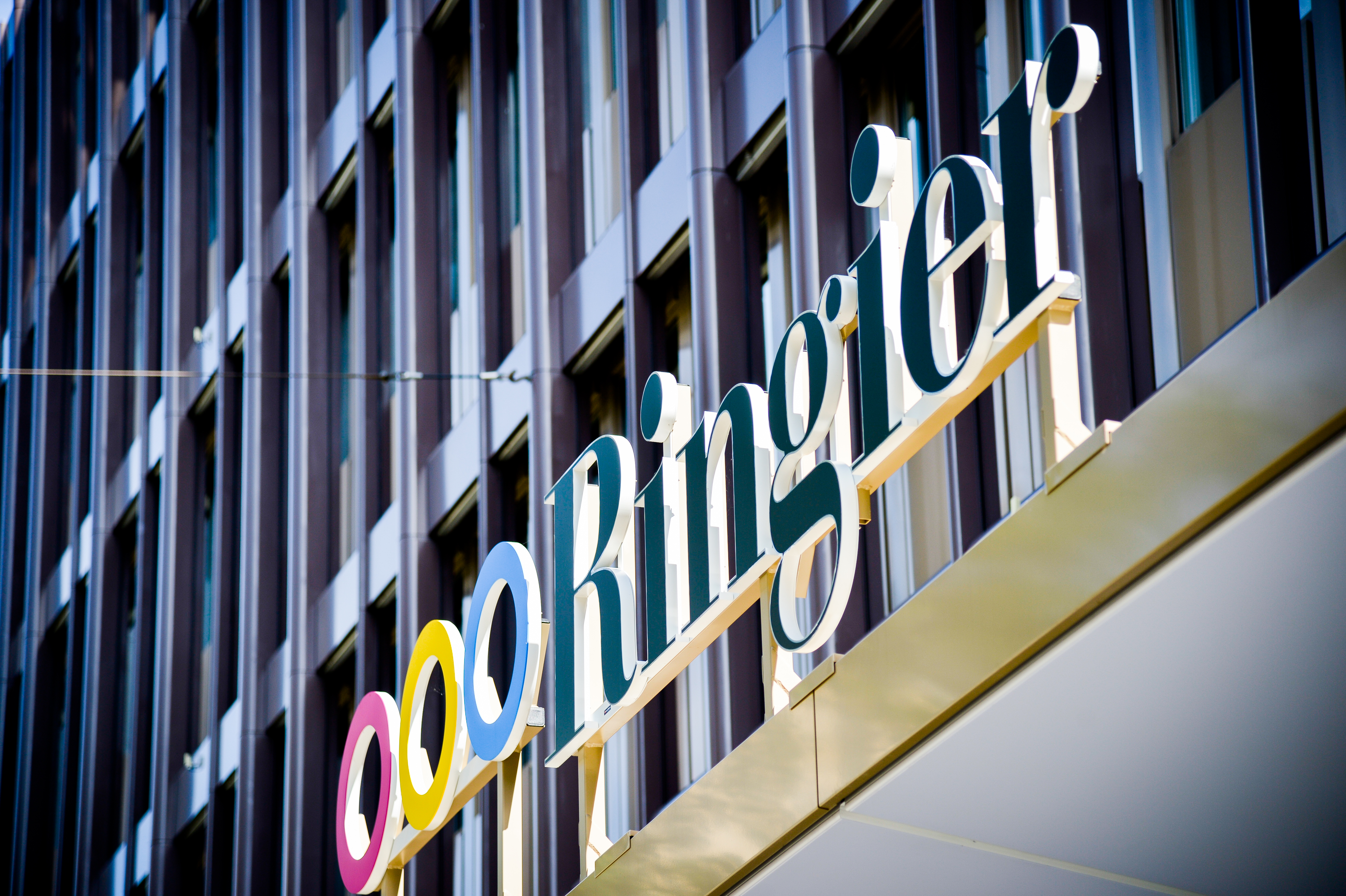
Logo above the main entrance of the Ringier press centre in Zurich

=== Founding and establishment (1833 to 1898) ===
The history of the family business dates back to 1833, when Johann Rudolf Ringier founded a printing press in Zofingen, Switzerland. The business started in the back room of his brother's house, Gottlieb Sigmund Ringier. As a publisher, Ringier launched its first newspaper Zofinger Wochenblatt in 1834. It was produced using a wooden hand press, capable of printing up to 250 copies per hour.

One year after its founding, the company moved to its own premises in Zofingen. However, the company's growth during the 19th century was tempered by various financial burdens and the emergence of competitors. Additionally, while other publishers and newspapers became increasingly political, Ringier did not follow this trend, resulting in further setbacks.

In 1874, the founder's son, Franz Emil Ringier, took over the company with the aim of making it competitive. He modernized the printing operations by introducing a high-speed press, which reduced production costs and increased capacity.

In 1898, Franz Emil Ringier died, and his son, Paul Ringier, took over the company.

=== Becoming a printing and publishing house (1899 to 1984) ===
In 1902, Paul Ringier entered into a partnership with competitors Francke and Brupacher and subsequently relocated within Zofingen. In 1906, both partners died, leaving Ringier to take over the entire business.

In 1911, the magazine Schweizer Illustrierte was first published as Schweizer Illustrierte Zeitung, and a decade later, its French-language counterpart L'Illustré was launched.

During World War I, demand for visual depictions and documentation of wartime events increased significantly. The print quality and use of images in the Schweizer Illustrierte Zeitung contributed to Ringier's expansion of its market position.

In 1959, the publishing house launched Blick, Switzerland's first tabloid newspaper. In the following years, Ringier introduced additional publications, such as the TV program guide Tele and Switzerland's first Sunday newspaper, SonntagsBlick. Between 1948 and 1994, Ringier also published the comic strip stories Ringgi and Zofi.

The company grew steadily through acquisitions. In 1973, it acquired the publishing house C.J. Bucher, including the former daily newspaper Luzerner Neueste Nachrichten. Subsequently, the Munich-based Heering-Verlag was acquired, which later became Ringier Deutschland GmbH. This publishing house specialized in photography books and magazines. In the 1980s, Ringier acquired a majority stake in the concert agency Good News, marking its first foray into cross-media entertainment.

The Ringier Pressehaus was opened in Zurich's Seefeld district in 1978, housing multiple editorial offices. In 1984, Ringier co-founded the TV program company Zürivision in collaboration with Tages-Anzeiger and Radio 24.

=== Generational change and internationalisation (1985 to 1999) ===
In 1985, Hans Ringier handed over the management of the company to his sons Christoph and Michael, who were already chairman of the board of directors and CEO, respectively.

This transition was followed by the company's expansion abroad. In 1987, the Times-Ringier printing facility was established in Hong Kong, and in 1989, Ringier acquired W.A. Krueger Co. in the United States. In 1989 and 1990, Ringier began operations in the Czech Republic and Romania. In 1993, the company initiated activities in Bulgaria, Poland, Hungary, and Vietnam. However, operations in Poland and Bulgaria were discontinued after three years.

In 1991, Christoph Ringier left the company, and Michael Ringier became chairman.

=== Digitalisation and economic growth (2000 to 2015) ===
In 1999, Ringier acquired a 50% stake in the television channel Sat.1 Switzerland.

During the 2000s, Ringier divested several divisions, holdings, and magazines. In 2001, Ringier Deutschland GmbH ceased operations. That same year, Ringier sold half of its shares in Betty Bossi, acquired in 1995, to the retailer Coop; the remaining shares were later also sold. In 2002, Axel Springer was rumored to have expressed interest in acquiring Ringier.

In 2004, Ringier re-entered the German market by launching the magazine Cicero through Ringier Publishing GmbH in Berlin.

On 15 May 2006, Ringier published Switzerland's first evening newspaper, the free daily heute, which was replaced on 2 June 2008, by the new free newspaper Blick am Abend. In June 2007, the financial newspaper Cash was discontinued after 18 years, and on 1 July 2007, Springer, through its Swiss subsidiary Jean Frey AG, acquired Ringier's German-language TV program magazines Tele, TV4, and TV2.

In 2009, Ringier transferred its physical photo archive to the Aargau state archive. In 2010 the editorial offices of Blick, SonntagsBlick, Blick am Abend and Blick.ch, together with Web-TV, were joined to form the largest and most modern newsroom in the country.

In 2011, Ringier began a gradual expansion into emerging markets in Africa, including Kenya, Nigeria, Ghana, Senegal, and Tanzania, primarily in the areas of digital news platforms and marketplaces. In 2012, Ringier founded Pulse in Africa under Ringier Africa Digital Publishing.

At the beginning of 2012, Ringier founded a joint venture with bank Zweiplus under the existing umbrella brand Cash, which offers online, finance and economic information, online financial services and online banking. The entire direct client business of bank Zweiplus was outsourced into this company.

In partnership with Zurich-based publishing house Tamedia (today TX Group), Ringier acquired jobs.ch Holding AG from the private equity firm Tiger Global Management in the fall of 2012. After approval from the competition commission at the end of 2012, the acquisition of Switzerland's largest job platform was completed.

In July 2014, Ringier announced the sale of a 49% stake in its subsidiary Scout24 Switzerland AG to the American investor KKR. In spring 2016, the Swiss insurer La Mobilière acquired KKR's shares, taking a 50% stake in Scout24 Switzerland AG, while Ringier continued to consolidate the company.

In November 2021, the joint venture SMG Swiss Marketplace Group was established by TX Group AG, Ringier AG, La Mobilière, and General Atlantic.

==== Joint venture with Axel Springer in Central Europe ====
In March 2010, Ringier and the German media company Axel Springer SE announced their intention to form a joint venture headquartered in Zurich, with both companies holding 50%. The joint venture was called Ringier Axel Springer Media AG. Axel Springer AG paid a contribution in cash of around €50 million and paid €125 million to compensate Ringier. The purpose of the joint venture was to combine all activities in Eastern Europe of the two companies inside one holding. Axel Springer AG brought the business of its subsidiaries in Poland, Czech Republic and Hungary, while Ringier brought its business in Serbia, Slovakia, Czech Republic and Hungary. The joint venture created one of the largest media companies in this sector of Europe, which became a market leader in tabloid newspapers and one of the largest providers in the magazine segment across the entire region.

In 2021, Ringier acquired all of the shares of Axel Springer in Hungary, Serbia, Slovakia, and the Baltic states of Estonia, Latvia and Lithuania. In Slovakia, the company founder remained a minority shareholder. In the other countries, the Ringier Group holds 100% of the shares.

==== Joint venture with Axel Springer in Switzerland ====
In January 2016, the Swiss joint venture Ringier Axel Springer Schweiz AG was founded together with Axel Springer. The media company's remit included both companies’ entire magazine portfolios in Switzerland as well as the Le Temps and Handelszeitung newspapers.

In November 2020, the French-speaking Swiss newspaper Le Temps was sold to the Aventinus Foundation. At the end of 2023, Ringier AG acquired all shares in Ringier Axel Springer Schweiz AG from Axel Springer.

=== Developments since 2015 ===
In May 2016, the two Ringier titles in Germany – Cicero and Monopol – were transferred to Christoph Schwennicke and Alexander Marguier in a management buyout. With this move, Ringier once again withdrew from the German market.

From January 2006 to March 2022, former German Chancellor Gerhard Schröder advised the company. After Russia's invasion of Ukraine in February 2022, Schröder faced increasing national and international pressure due to his proximity to President Vladimir Putin. In early March 2022, Ringier ended Schröder's advisory role.

In April 2016, the joint sales and marketing organisation from Ringier, Swisscom and Swiss Broadcasting Corporation began operations under the name Admeira. The project was first launched on 17 August 2015, and Marc Walder was among its initiators. The venture's objective of keeping more digital advertising funds in Switzerland was met with criticism from competitors. The goals of this joint operation were not met. After the Swiss Broadcasting Corporation had already left this venture, Swisscom decided to leave as well, selling their interest in Admeira to Ringier. Therefore, Admeira became a wholly owned subsidiary of Ringier in 2020 concentrating on TV advertising.

In February 2020, Ringier announced that La Mobilière had acquired a 25% stake in the company.

In 2021, Ringier, together with TX Group, founded the joint venture OneLog. In late December 2022, CH Media and NZZ joined OneLog.

In 2022, Ringier Sports Media Group was created as a sports media division.

== Company structure ==
Ringier AG is owned by the families of Michael Ringier and Evelyn Lingg-Ringier. Michael Ringier is the chairman of the Board of Directors of the company. Since 2012, Marc Walder has been the CEO of Ringier AG. He is a minority shareholder in the company, together with the Swiss insurer La Mobilière.

In 2023, Ringier generated revenue of CHF 918.9 million and employed 6,571 people.

As of 2024, the media company has over 140 subsidiaries in Europe. Additionally, Ringier has subsidiaries in Africa.

== Business units and publications ==
=== Media ===
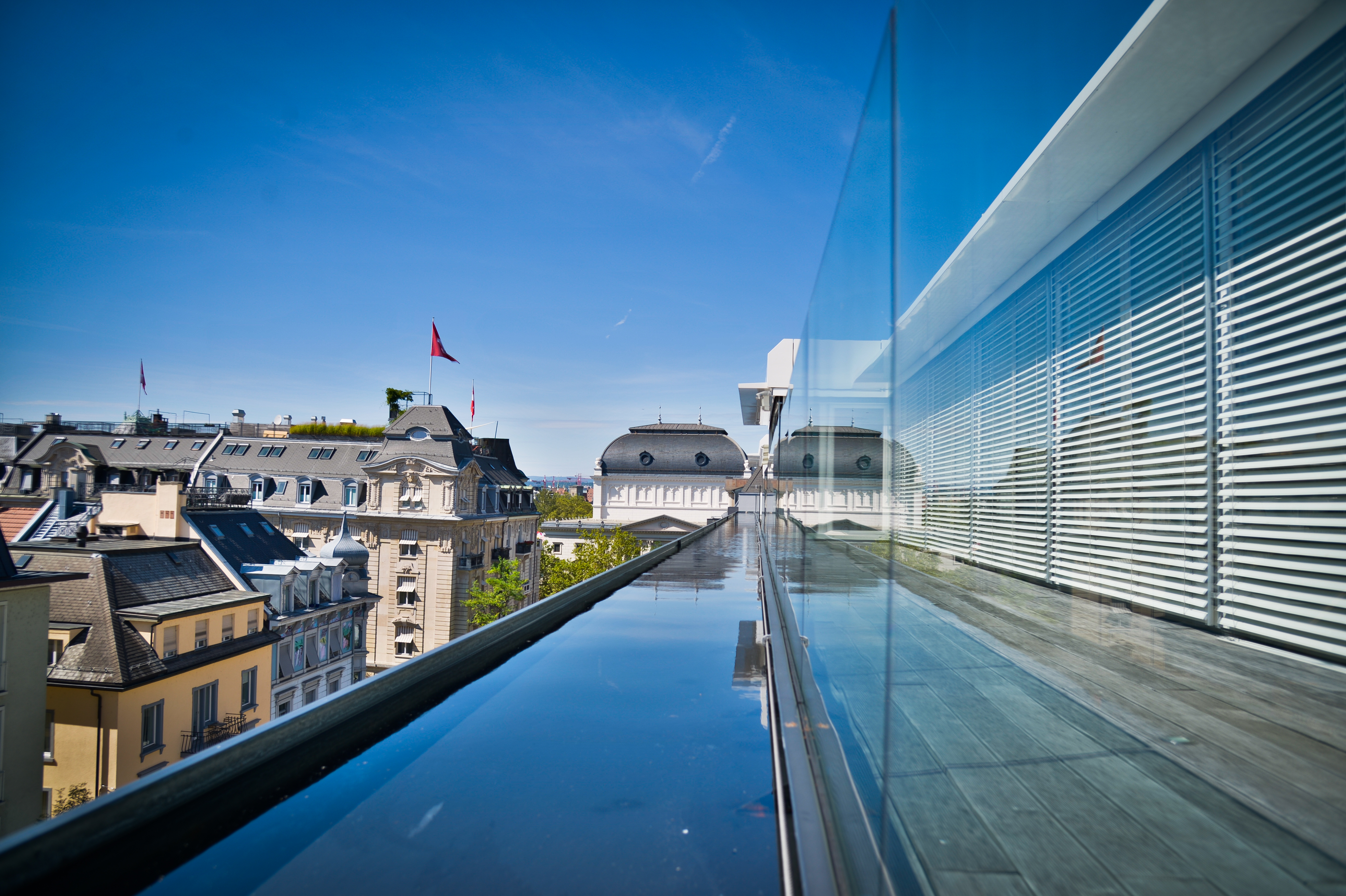
View from the 6th floor of the Ringier press centre in Zurich

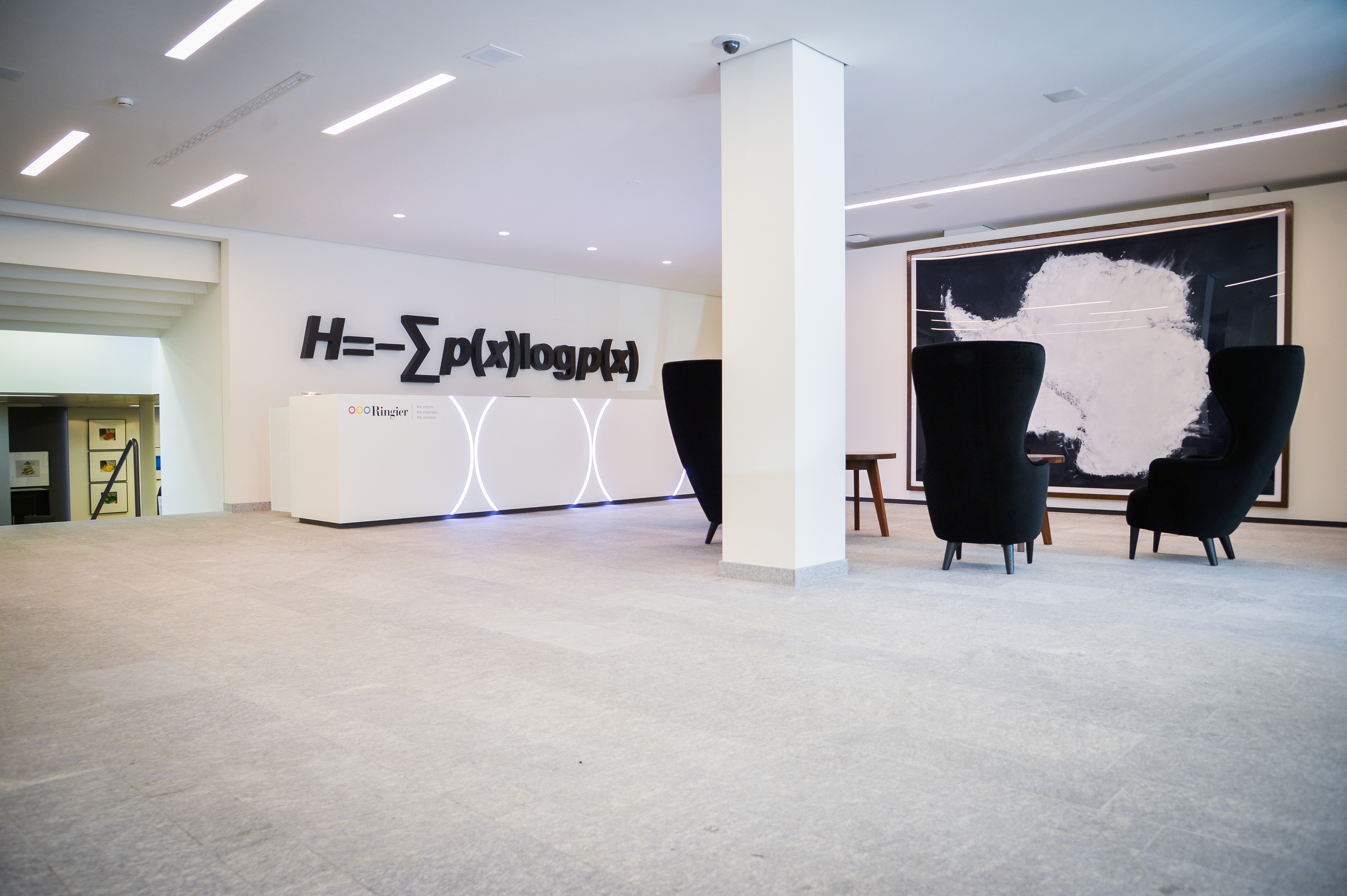
Reception desk of the Ringier press centre in Zurich

In Switzerland, Ringier publishes numerous newspapers and magazines, including their online products. Since November 2023, Swiss media titles, except for the Energy Group Switzerland, have been grouped under Ringier Medien Schweiz.

==== Switzerland ====
===== Media (Selection) =====
- Beobachter (Business magazine)
- Bilanz (Business magazine)
- Blick, SonntagsBlick (Print and online newspapers)
- Gault Millau (Food guide)
- Handelszeitung (Business magazine)
- Schweizer Illustrierte (Magazine)
- L’illustré (Magazine)

===== TV =====
Ringier produces various lifestyle TV formats such as Blick TV, Presse TV and LandLiebe TV.

===== Radio =====
The radio range includes the private radio stations of Energy Zurich, Bern, Basel, St. Gallen and Lucerne, in which both Ringier and the NRJ Group hold stakes.

==== Media in Europe and Africa ====
In Europe Ringier is active in Switzerland, Bulgaria, Greece, Hungary, the Netherlands, Poland, Portugal, Romania, Serbia, Slovakia, Estonia, Latvia and Lithuania. Additionally, Ringier operates in Ghana, Senegal, Nigeria, Kenya, Uganda, Ivory Coast, and South Africa, running digital media brands and marketplaces.

==== Digital Sports Media ====
In May 2022, Ringier founded the Ringier Sports Media Group (RSMG) as an independent company based in Zofingen. The company operates eight sports media platforms in eight European countries and holds a stake in the international LiveScore Group. In December 2023, RSMG acquired shares in sport.sk in Slovakia from its previous partner, Nikè.

In 2023, RSMG expanded into Greece with the launch of sportal.gr. In Portugal, it acquired A Bola. In Romania, it operates through GSP.ro, and with the Dutch DPG Media Group, it has a joint venture, Sportnieuws.nl.

=== Digital Marketplaces ===
Ringier invests in online platforms, mobile apps, digital marketplaces, e-commerce, online advertising, and technology.

Ringier owned several Swiss digital marketplaces and classifieds platforms, which were incorporated into the joint venture SMG Swiss Marketplaces Group established in 2021. The online marketplaces in Switzerland also include the brands AutoScout24, MotoScout24 and ImmoScout24. Additionally, Ringier, along with TX Group, holds a 50% stake in the largest Swiss job market company JobCloud AG with platforms like Jobs.ch, Jobup.ch, Topjobs.ch, JobScout24 and Alpha.ch.

== Ringier School of Journalism ==
In 1974, Hans Ringier founded the first journalism school in Switzerland. Since then, many of today's prominent media-creators have learned the journalistic trade at the Jou-Schu. Publisher Michael Ringier and Ringier's CEO Marc Walder attended the in-house school. The journalism school is operated by the Hans Ringier Foundation. The two-year program combines theory with practical experience in the internal Ringier editorial offices. Since its founding, over 300 journalists have graduated with a diploma. The journalism school has been led by journalist Peter Hossli since 1 May 2022.

== Printing plants ==
Essential to the main business of the company were several printing plants in Switzerland (Zofingen and Adligenswil). The printing plant in Zofingen was founded in 1833 and has since then been integrated into Swissprinters. In early 2024, it was announced that Swissprinters would close in September 2024.

Since 1975, Ringier Print in Adligenswil has been printing internal and external newspapers. On 8 November 2017, Ringier announced that Ringier Print would close by the end of 2018 due to declining prices and decreasing circulation. The newspapers printed there, such as Blick, SonntagsBlick, and Handelszeitung, had been printed by Tamedia since early 2019. It had already been announced earlier that the NZZ Media Group would also switch the printing of the Luzerner Zeitung and its regional editions from Ringier Print to Tamedia starting in 2019, which also influenced Ringier's decision. This affected 172 employees.

== EqualVoice ==
On 25 November 2019, the Ringier Group launched the EqualVoice initiative. The goal of the initiative is to increase the visibility of women in media coverage. According to Ringier, 75% of media reports focus on men, as stated in a press release. Publisher Michael Ringier and CEO Marc Walder are overseeing the project, which was initiated by CFO Annabella Bassler. The National Advisory Board includes, among others, Carolina Müller-Möhl (President of the Müller-Möhl Foundation) and Pascale Baeriswyl (Diplomat).

== Documentation ==
- Christian Kolbe: Spuren der Zeit 175 Jahre Ringier – Patriarchen, Presse und Profit. In: DOK, Schweizer Fernsehen, 5 May 2008.
- Alain Jeannet: Nous sommes tous dépassés par les exigences de la numérisation, Marc Walder Interview. In: L'Hebdo, 19 January 2017.
- Stéphane Benoit-Godet: Il faut accélérer la digitalisation dans tous les domaines, Marc Walder Interview. In: Le Temps, 30 September 2017.

== Literature ==
- Karl Lüönd: Ringier bei den Leuten. Die bewegte Geschichte eines ungewöhnlichen Familienunternehmens. NZZ Libro, Zurich 2008, ISBN 978-3-03823-400-5.
- Peter Meier, Thomas Häusler: Zwischen Masse, Markt und Macht. Das Medienunternehmen Ringier im Wandel (1833–2009). Chronos, Zurich February 2010, ISBN 978-3-0340-0952-2.
- René Lüchinger: Ringen um Ringier. Steidl, Göttingen 2019, ISBN 978-3-95829-588-9.
