= Annals of the New York Academy of Sciences =

- Discipline: Science
- Language: English
- Edited by: Douglas Braaten

Publication details
- Former name: Annals of the Lyceum of Natural History of New York
- History: 1823–present
- Publisher: Wiley-Blackwell, on behalf of the New York Academy of Sciences (United States)
- Frequency: 32/year
- Open access: Hybrid
- Impact factor: 4.5 (2025)

Standard abbreviations
- ISO 4: Ann. N. Y. Acad. Sci.

Indexing
- CODEN: ANYAA9
- ISSN: 0077-8923 (print); 1749-6632 (web)
- LCCN: 12037287
- OCLC no.: 01306678

Links
- Journal homepage; Online access; Online archive; Journal page at publishers website

The Annals of the New York Academy of Sciences is an academic journal published by Wiley-Blackwell on behalf of the New York Academy of Sciences. It is one of the oldest science journals still being published, having been founded in 1823. The editor-in-chief is Douglas Braaten. Each issue is of substantial length and explores a single topic with a multidisciplinary approach. A review published on Ulrichsweb states the scope is enormous and describes the journal as highly respected and the articles as penetrating.

== Abstracting and indexing ==
The journal is abstracted and indexed in:

- Academic OneFile
- Academic Search
- BIOSIS Previews
- BIOSIS Reviews Reports and Meetings
- CAB Abstracts
- Chemical Abstracts
- Chimica
- CINAHL
- Dietrich's Index Philosophicus
- Embase
- GeoRef
- Global Health
- Index Medicus/MEDLINE/PubMed
- Inspec
- International Bibliography of Periodical Literature
- MathSciNet
- The Philosopher's Index
- Science Citation Index
- Scopus
- Tropical Diseases Bulletin
- Zentralblatt MATH
- Zoological Record

According to the Journal Citation Reports, the journal has a 2025 impact factor of 4.5, ranking it 24th out of 140 journals in the category "Multidisciplinary sciences".
