= Schweizer Illustrierte =

Sweiss weekly news magazine

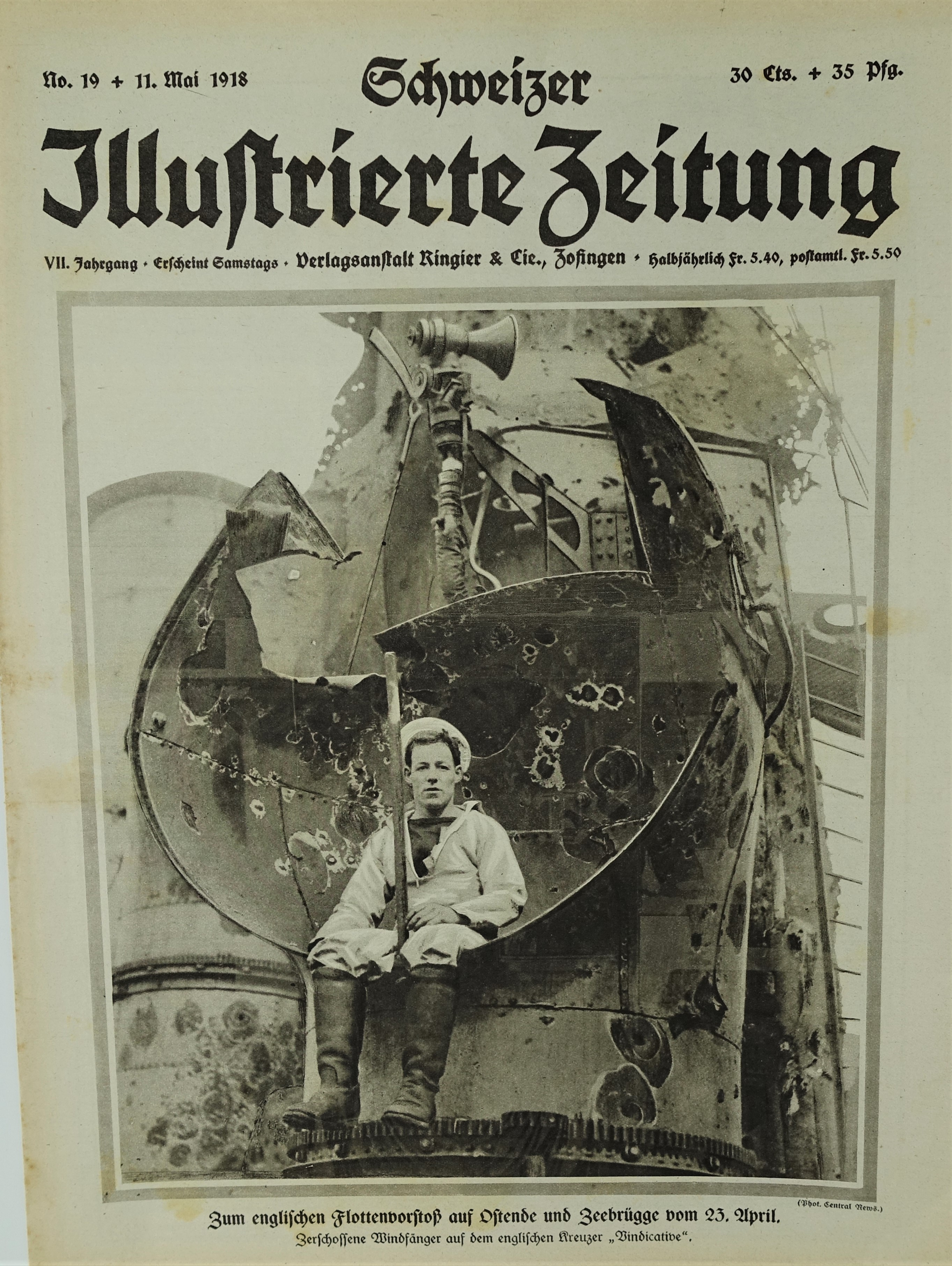
- Title page of a 1918 edition of the Schweizer Illustrierte Zeitung, in the Jewish Museum of Switzerland’s collection
- Editor-in-chief: Stefan Regez, Werner De Schepper
- Categories: News magazine
- Frequency: Weekly
- Founded: 1911; 115 years ago
- Company: Ringier
- Country: Switzerland
- Based in: Zurich
- Language: German
- Website: Schweizer Illustrierte

Schweizer Illustrierte is a weekly illustrated news magazine owned by Swiss media company Ringier.

== History and profile ==
Schweizer Illustrierte was established in 1911 as Schweizer Illustrierte Zeitung (SIZ), and adopted its current name in 1965. The magazine is published weekly in German. It is published by a company with the same name and offers news about stars, opinion leaders and idols. The magazine has no focus on political news.

The headquarters of Schweizer Illustrierte is in Zurich. Stefan Regez is the editor-in-chief of the weekly. Peter Rothenbuehler is among the former editors-in-chief.

The iPad application of Schweizer Illustrierte was launched in 2010.

== Circulation ==
Between July 2004 and June 2005 Schweizer Illustrierte sold 240,240 copies. Its circulation was 232,519 copies between July 2005 and June 2006 and 225,753 copies between July 2006 and June 2007. The circulation of the magazine became 209,121 copies between July 2007 and June 2008. The weekly was the second best-selling magazine in Switzerland with a circulation of 204,856 copies in 2009.

== See also ==
- List of magazines in Switzerland
