= Red Orchestra (espionage) =

World War II anti-Nazi resistance movement

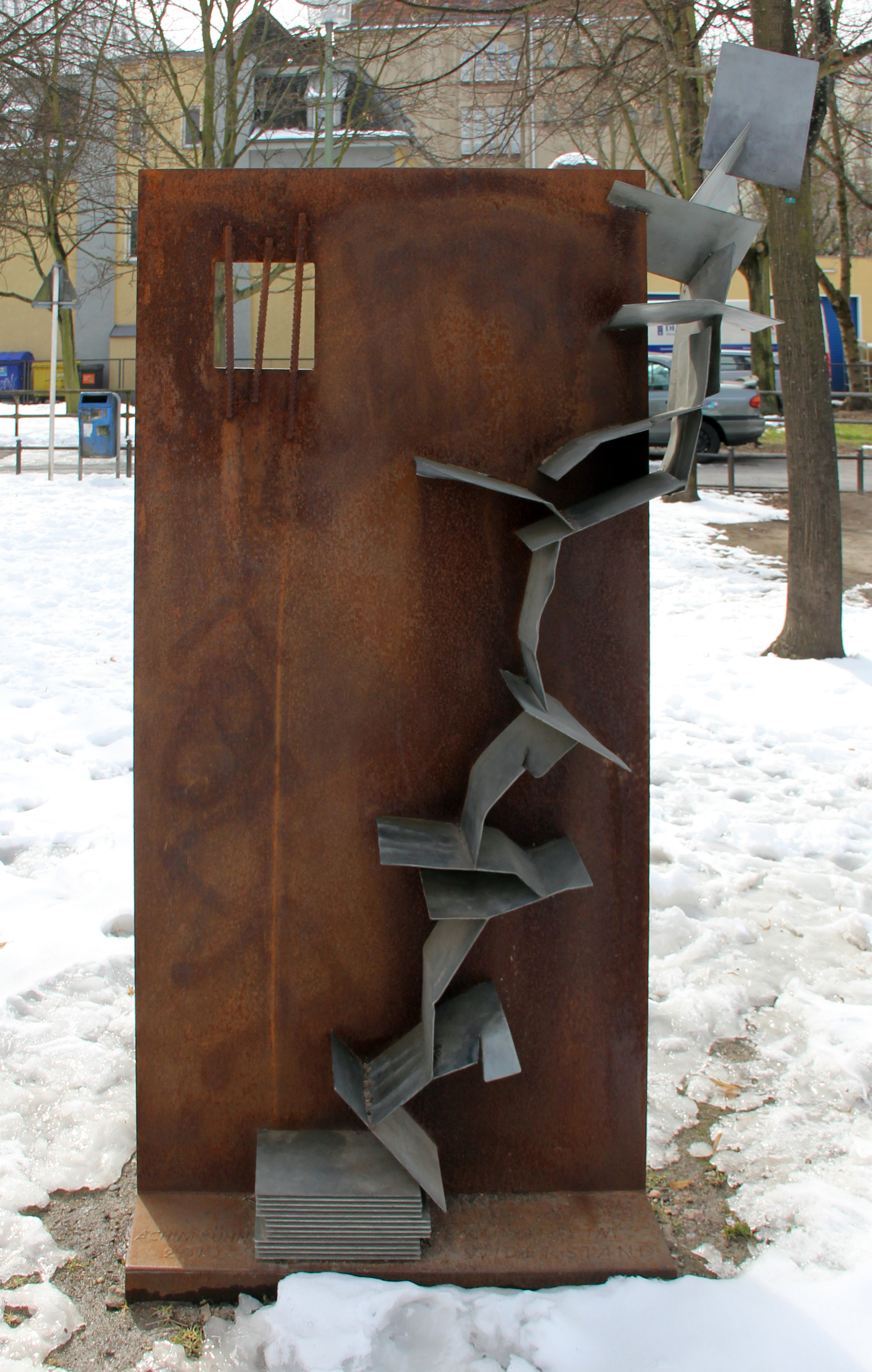
2010 sculpture by Achim Kühn, at Schulze-Boysen-Straße 12, in Lichtenberg, Berlin

The Red Orchestra (German: Rote Kapelle, pronounced [ˈʁoːtə kaˈpɛlə]) was the name given by the Abwehr Section III.F to anti-Nazi resistance workers in Germany in August 1941. It primarily referred to a loose network of resistance groups, connected through personal contacts, uniting hundreds of opponents of the Nazi regime. These included groups of friends (centred on Harro Schulze-Boysen, Adam Kuckhoff and Arvid Harnack in Berlin, alongside many others) who held discussions. They printed and distributed prohibited leaflets, posters, and stickers, hoping to incite civil disobedience. They aided Jews and resistance workers to escape the regime, documented the atrocities of the Nazis, and transmitted military intelligence to the Allies. Contrary to legend, the Red Orchestra was neither directed by Soviet communists nor under a single leadership. It was a network of groups and individuals, often operating independently. To date, about 400 members are known by name.

The term was also used by the German Abwehr to refer to associated Soviet intelligence networks, working in Belgium, France, United Kingdom and the Low Countries, that were built up by Leopold Trepper on behalf of the Main Directorate of State Security (GRU). Trepper ran a series of clandestine cells for organising agents. He used the latest technology, in the form of small wireless radios, to communicate with Soviet intelligence.

Although the monitoring of the radios' transmissions by the Funkabwehr would eventually lead to the organisation's destruction, the sophisticated use of the technology enabled the organisation to behave as a network, with the ability to achieve tactical surprise and deliver high-quality intelligence, including the warning of Operation Barbarossa.

To this day, the German public perception of the "Red Orchestra" is characterised by the vested interest in historical revisionism of the post-war years and propaganda efforts of both sides of the Cold War.

== Reappraisal ==
For a long time after World War II, only parts of the German resistance to Nazism had been known to the public within Germany and the world at large. This included the groups that took part in the 20 July plot and the White Rose resistance groups. In the 1970s there was a growing interest in the various forms of resistance and opposition. However, no organisation's history was so subject to systematic misinformation, and as little recognised, as those resistance groups centred on Arvid Harnack and Harro Schulze-Boysen.

In a number of publications, the groups that these two people represented were seen as traitors and spies. An example of these was Kennwort: Direktor; die Geschichte der Roten Kapelle (Password: Director; The history of the Red Orchestra) written by Heinz Höhne who was a Der Spiegel journalist. Höhne based his book on the investigation by the Lüneburg Public Prosecutor's Office against the General Judge of the Luftwaffe and Nazi apologist Manfred Roeder who prosecuted the Harnack and Schulze-Boysen cases during World War II and who contributed decisively to the formation of the legend that survived for much of the Cold War period. In his book Höhne reports from former Gestapo and Reich war court individuals who had a conflict of interest and were intent on defaming the groups attached to Harnack and Schulze-Boysen with accusations of treason.

The perpetuation of the defamation from the 1940s through to the 1970s that started with the Gestapo was incorporated by the Lüneburg Public Prosecutor's Office and evaluated as a journalistic process that can be seen by the 1968 trial of Nazi judge turned far-right Holocaust denier Manfred Roeder by the German lawyer Robert Kempner. The Frankfurt public prosecutor's office, which prosecuted the case against Roeder, based its investigation on procedure case number "1 Js 16/49" which was the trial case number defined by the Lüneburg Public Prosecutor's Office. The whole process propagated the Gestapo ideas of the Red Orchestra and this was promulgated in the report of the public prosecutor's office which stated:

In the course of time, a group of political supporters of different characters and backgrounds gathered around these two men and their wives. They were united in their active opposition to National Socialism and in their support for communism. Until the outbreak of war with the Soviet Union, the focus of their work was on domestic policy. After that, it shifted more to the field of treason and espionage in favour of the Soviet Union. At the beginning of 1942, the Schulze-Boysen group was finally integrated into the widely ramified network of Soviet intelligence in Western Europe. The value of the intelligence passed on by the Schulze-Boysen group to the Soviet intelligence service cannot be underestimated according to general judgement. All persons who had to deal with this material in their official capacity agree that it was the most dangerous treason organisation uncovered during World War II.... In no... case, however, it is certain that those convicted were only sentenced for high treason and favouring the enemy. The Schulze-Boysen group was first and foremost a spy organisation for the Soviet Union. Since the outbreak of war with Russia, internal resistance took a back seat to espionage work, and it can be assumed that all members were used directly or indirectly for intelligence gathering.

From the perspective of the German Democratic Republic (GDR) the Red Orchestra were honoured as anti-fascist resistance fighters and indeed received posthumous orders in 1969. Accordingly, the most comprehensive collection of biographies that exist are from the GDR, by Karl Heinz Biernat and Luise Kraushaar Die Schulze- Boysen- Harnack- Organisation im antifaschistischen Kampf (2002) and they represent their point of view, through the lens of ideology.

In the 1980s, the GDR historian Heinrich Scheel, who at the time was vice president of the East German Academy of Sciences and who was part of the anti-Nazi Tegeler group (named after the area they met in, in Berlin) that included Hans Coppi from 1933, conducted research into the Rote Kapelle and produced a paper which took a more nuanced view of the Rote Kapelle and discovered the work that was done to defame them. Scheel's work led to a re-evaluation of the Rote Kapelle, but it was not until 2009 that the German Bundestag overturned the judgments of the National Socialist judiciary for "treason" and rehabilitated the members of the group.

== Name ==
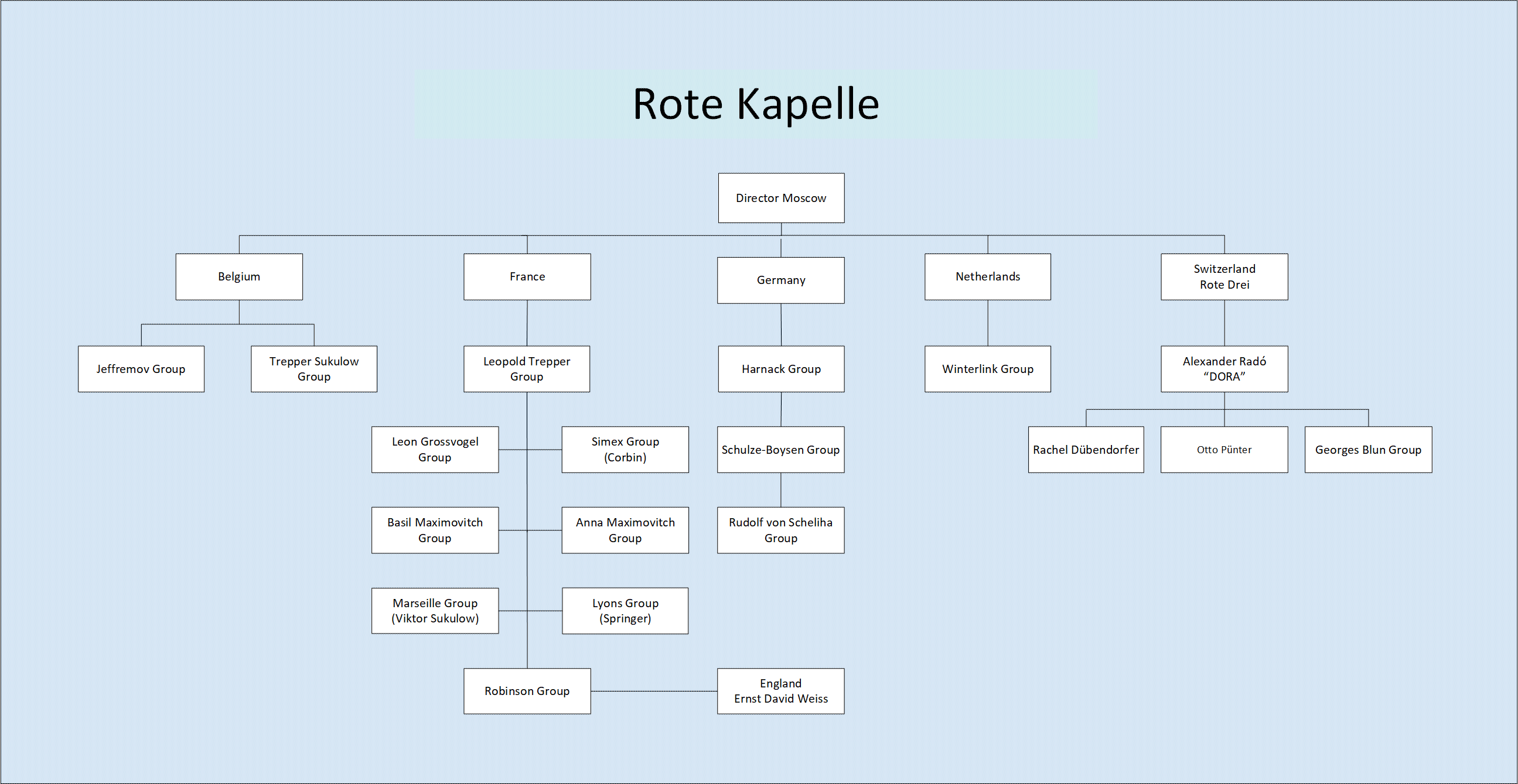
Diagram of the various groups of the Red Orchestra

The name Rote Kapelle was a cryptonym that was invented for a secret operation started by Abwehrstelle Belgium (Ast Belgium), a field office of Abwehr III.F in August 1941 and conducted against a Soviet intelligence station that had been detected in Brussels in June 1941. Kapelle was an accepted Abwehr term for counter-espionage operations against secret wireless transmitting stations and in the case of the Brussels stations Rote was used to differentiate from other enterprises conducted by Ast Belgium.

In July 1942, the case of the Red Orchestra was taken over from Ast Belgium by section IV. A.2. of the Sicherheitsdienst. When Soviet agent Anatoly Gurevich was arrested in November 1942, a small independent unit made up of Gestapo personnel known as the Sonderkommando Rote Kapelle was formed in Paris in the same month and led by SS-Obersturmbannführer (Colonel) Friedrich Panzinger.

The Reichssicherheitshauptamt (RSHA), the counter-espionage part of the Schutzstaffel (SS), referred to resistance radio operators as "pianists", their transmitters as "pianos", and their supervisors as "conductors".

Only after the Funkabwehr had decrypted radio messages in August 1942, in which German names appeared, did the Gestapo start to arrest and imprison them, their friends and relatives. In 2002, the German filmmaker Stefan Roloff, whose father Helmut Roloff was a member of one of the Red Orchestra groups, stated of them:

Because of their contact with the Soviets, the Brussels and Berlin groups were grouped together by the Counterintelligence and Gestapo, under the misleading name of the Rote Kapelle. A radio operator who tapped Morse code characters with his fingers was a pianist in the secret service language. A group of "pianists" formed a "band", and since the Morse code had come from Moscow, the "orchestra" was communist and therefore red. This misunderstanding laid the foundation on which the resistance group would later be treated as a Soviet espionage organisation, until this could be corrected in the early 1990s. The construct of a Red Orchestra organization, created by the Gestapo never existed as such

In his research, the historian Hans Coppi Jr., whose father was also a member, Hans Coppi, emphasised that, in view of the Western European groups:

..a 'Red Orchestra' network in Western Europe, led by Leopold Trepper did not exist. The various groups in Belgium, Holland and France worked largely independently of one another.

The German political scientist Johannes Tuchel summed up in a research article for the Gedenkstätte Deutscher Widerstand.

The Gestapo identifies it under the collective name "Red Orchestra" and wants it to be viewed above all as an espionage organisation of the Soviet Union. This designation, which reduces the groups around Harnack and Schulze-Boysen to contacts with the Soviet intelligence service, continues to shape the public image in Germany also after 1945, distorting their motives and goals, even after 1945. At the end of 1942, the Reich Court Martial passes the first death sentences; in total, more than fifty members of this group are murdered.

== Germany ==
=== Schulze-Boysen/Harnack group ===
The Red Orchestra, as historically viewed in the world today, are mainly the resistance groups around the Luftwaffe officer Harro Schulze-Boysen, the writer Adam Kuckhoff and the economist Arvid Harnack, to which historians assign more than 100 people.

=== Origin ===
Harnack and Schulze-Boysen had similar political views, both rejected the Treaty of Versailles of 1919, and sought alternatives to the existing social order. Since the Great Depression of 1929, they saw the Soviet planned economy as a positive counter-model to the free-market economy. They wanted to introduce planned economic elements in Germany and work closely with the Soviet Union without breaking German bridges to the rest of Europe.

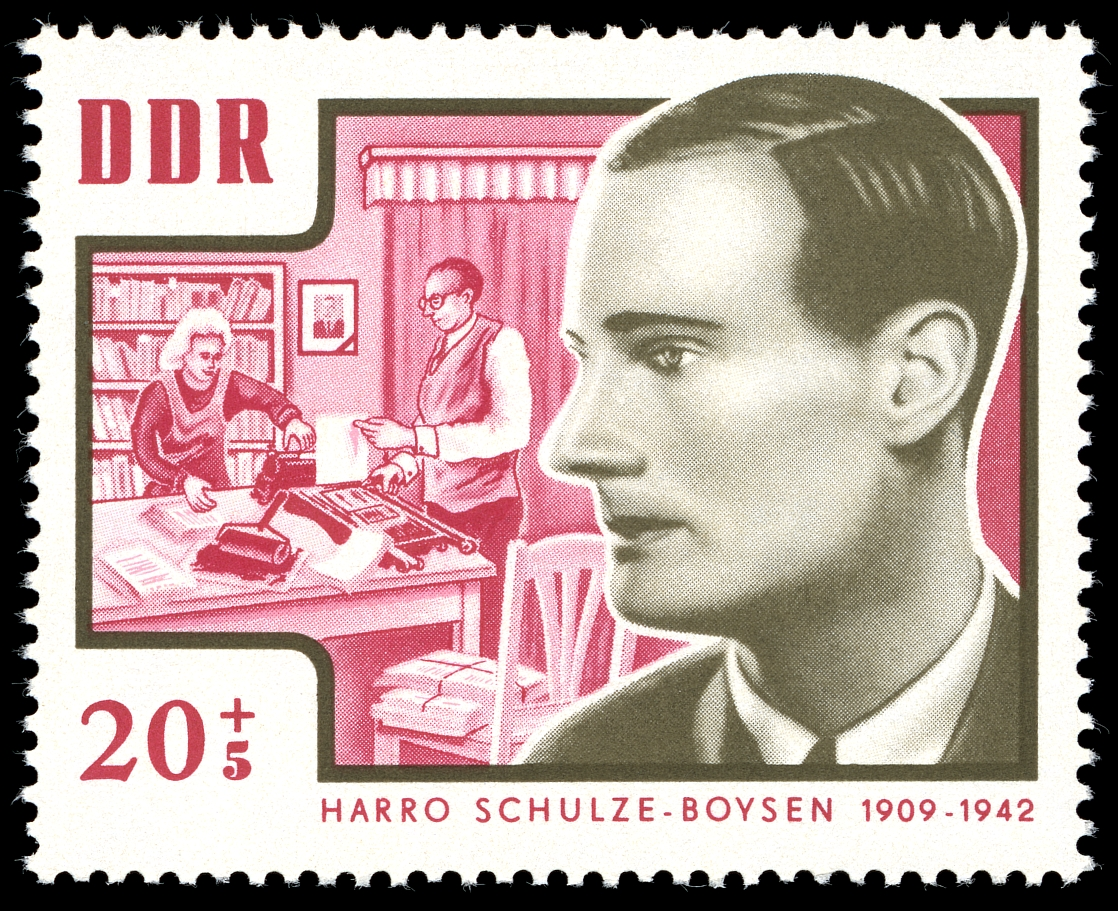
Harro Schulze-Boysen; East Germany (1964)

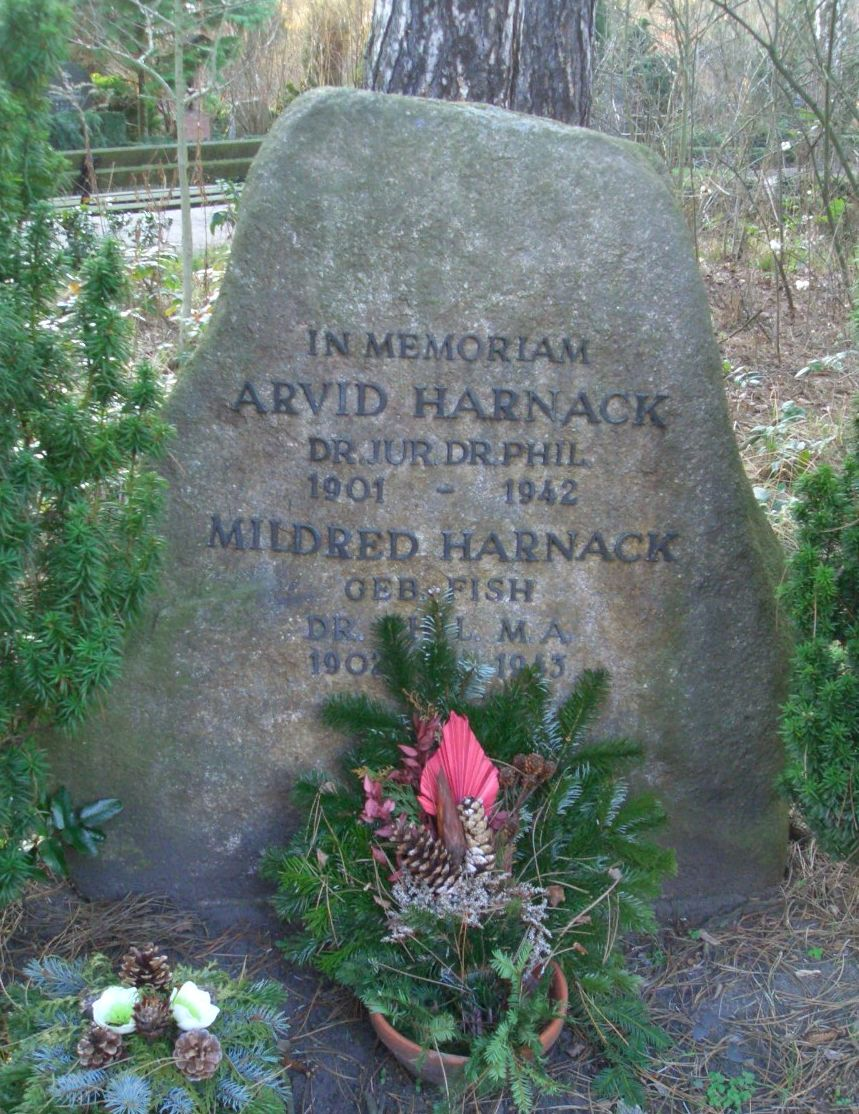
Memorial stone for Arvid and Mildred Harnack at Friedhof Zehlendorf cemetery in Berlin-Zehlendorf, Onkel-Tom-Straße 30–33

Before 1933, Schulze-Boysen published the non-partisan leftist and later banned magazine German: Gegner, lit. 'opponent'. In April 1933, the Sturmabteilung detained him for some time, severely battered him, and killed a fellow Jewish inmate. As a trained pilot, he received a position of trust in 1934 in the Reich Ministry of Aviation and had access to war-important information. After his marriage to Libertas Schulze-Boysen in 1936, the couple collected young intellectuals from diverse backgrounds, including the artist couple Kurt and Elisabeth Schumacher, the writers Günther Weisenborn and Walter Küchenmeister, the dancer Oda Schottmüller, the photojournalist John Graudenz (who had been expelled from the USSR for reporting the Soviet famine of 1932–1933), Gisela von Pöllnitz, the actor Marta Husemann and her husband Walter in 1938, and the doctors Elfriede Paul and John Rittmeister in 1937 and Christmas 1941 respectively. Schulze-Boysen held twice-monthly meetings at his Charlottenburg atelier for thirty-five to forty people in what was considered a Bohemian circle of friends. Initially, these meetings followed an informatics program of resistance that was in keeping with its environment and were important places of personal and political understanding but also vanishing points from an often unbearable reality, essentially serving as islands of democracy. As the decade progressed they increasingly served as identity-preserving forms of self-assertion and cohesion as the Nazi state became all-encompassing. Formats of the meetings usually started with book discussions in the first 90 minutes, were followed by Marxist discussions and resistance activities, and were interspersed with parties, picnics, sailing on the Wannsee and poetry readings until midnight as the mood took them. However, with the realisation that the war preparations were becoming unstoppable, Schulze-Boysen, whom the group looked to for leadership, called for them to cease their discussions and start resisting.

Other friends were found by Schulze-Boysen among former students of a reform school on the island of Scharfenberg in Berlin-Tegel. These often came from communist or social – democratic workers' families, e.g. Hans and Hilde Coppi, Heinrich Scheel, Hermann Natterodt and Hans and Ina Lautenschlager. Some of these contacts existed before 1933, for example through the German Society of intellectuals. John Rittmeister's wife Eva was a good friend of Liane Berkowitz, Ursula Goetze, Friedrich Rehmer, Maria Terwiel and Fritz Thiel who met in the 1939 abitur class at the secondary private school, Heil'schen Abendschule at Berlin W 50, Augsburger Straße 60 in Schöneberg. The Romanist Werner Krauss joined this group, and through discussions, an active resistance to the Nazi regime grew. Ursula Goetze who was part of the group, provided contacts with the communist groups in Neukölln.

From 1932 onwards, the economist Arvid Harnack and his American wife Mildred assembled a group of friends and members of the Berlin Marxist Workers School (MASCH) to form a discussion group that debated the political and economic perspectives at the time. Harnak's group meetings, in contrast to those of Schulze-Boysen's group, were considered rather austere. Members of the group included the German politician and Minister of Culture Adolf Grimme, the locksmith Karl Behrens, the German journalist Adam Kuckhoff and his wife Greta and the industrialist and entrepreneur Leo Skrzypczynski. From 1935, Harnack tried to camouflage his activities by becoming a member of the Nazi Party working in the Reich Ministry of Economics with the rank of Oberregierungsrat. Through this work, Harnack planned to train them to build a free and socially just Germany after the end of the National Socialism regime.

The dancer Oda Schottmüller and Erika Gräfin von Brockdorff were friends with the Kuckhoffs. In 1937 Adam Kuckhoff introduced Harnack to the journalist and former journalist railway worker John Sieg, a former editor of the Communist Party of Germany (KPD) newspaper the Die Rote Fahne. As a railway worker at the Deutsche Reichsbahn, Sieg was able to make use of work-related travel, enabling him to found a communist resistance group in the Neukölln borough in Berlin. He knew the former Foreign Affairs Minister Wilhelm Guddorf and Martin Weise. In 1934 Guddorf was arrested and sentenced to hard labour. In 1939 after his release from the Sachsenhausen concentration camp, Guddorf worked as a bookseller, and worked closely with Schulze-Boysen.

This network grew after Adam and Greta Kuckhoff introduced Harro and Libertas Schulze-Boysen to Arvid and Mildred Harnack, and the couples began engaging socially. Their hitherto separate groups moved together once the Polish campaign began in September 1939. From 1940 onwards, they regularly exchanged their opinions on the war and other Nazi policies and sought action against it. Through such contacts, a loose network formed in Berlin in the early weeks of 1942, of seven interconnected groups centred on personal friendships as well as groups originally formed for discussion and education. This disparate network was composed of over 150 Berlin Nazi opponents, including artists, scientists, citizens, workers, and students from several different backgrounds. There were Communists, political conservatives, Jews, Catholics, and atheists. Their ages ranged from 16 to 86, and about 40% of the group were women. Group members had different political views, but searched for the open exchange of views, at least in the private sector. For instance, Schulze-Boysen and Harnack shared some ideas with the Communist Party of Germany, while others were devout Catholics such as Maria Terwiel and her husband Helmut Himpel. Uniting all of them was the firm rejection of National Socialism.

The historian Heinrich Scheel, a schoolmate of Hans Coppi, judged these groups by stating:

Only with this stable hinterland was it possible to survive all the minor mishaps and major catastrophes and give our resistance permanence.

As early as 1934, Scheel had passed written material from one contact person to the next within clandestine communist cells and had seen how easily such connections were lost if a meeting did not materialise due to one party being arrested. In a relaxed group of friends and discussion with like-minded people, it was easy to find supporters for an action.

=== Acts of resistance ===
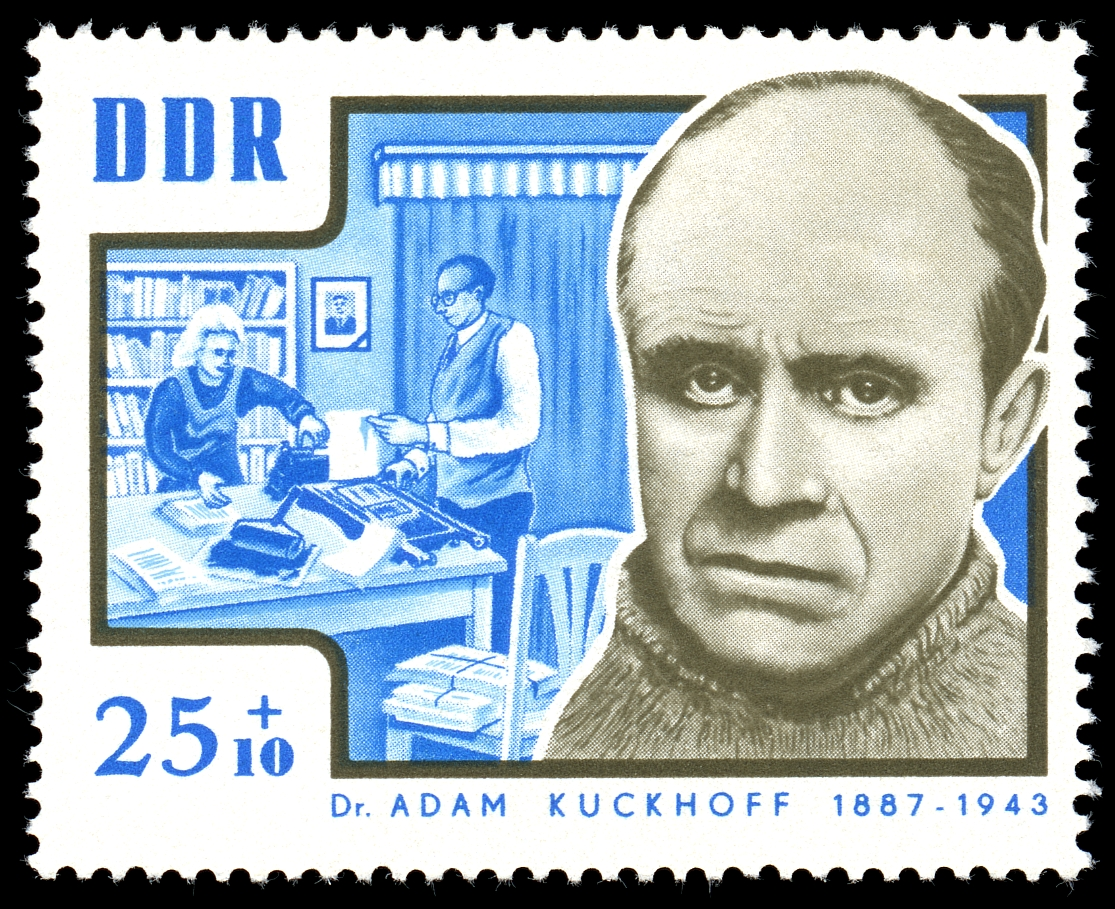
Adam Kuckhoff, DDR

From 1933 onwards, the Berlin groups connected to Schulze-Boysen and Harnack resisted the Nazis by:

- Providing assistance to the persecuted.
- Disseminating pamphlets and leaflets that contained dissident content.
- Writing letters to prominent individuals including university professors.
- Collecting and sharing information, including on foreign representatives, on German war preparations, crimes of the Wehrmacht and Nazi crimes.
- Contacting other opposition groups and foreign forced labourers.
- Invoking disobedience of Nazi representatives.
- Writing drafts for a possible post-war order.

From mid-1936, the Spanish Civil War preoccupied the Schulze-Boysen group. Through Walter Küchenmeister, the Schulze-Boysen group began to discuss more concrete actions, and during these meetings would listen to foreign radio stations from London, Paris and Moscow. A plan was formed to take advantage of Schulze-Boysen's employment, and through this, the group was able to get detailed information on Germany's support of Francisco Franco. Beginning in 1937, in the Wilmersdorf waiting room of Dr. Elfriede Paul, they began distributing the first leaflet on the Spanish Civil War.

In the same year, Schulze-Boysen had compiled a document about a sabotage enterprise planned in Barcelona by the Wehrmacht "Special Staff W", an organisation established by Helmuth Wilberg to analyse the tactical lessons learned by the Legion Kondor during the war. The information that Schulze-Boysen collected included details about German transports, deployment of units and companies involved in the German defense. Libertas's cousin, Gisela von Pöllnitz placed the letter in the mailbox of the Soviet Embassy on the Bois de Boulogne in Paris.

After the Munich Agreement, Schulze-Boysen created a second leaflet with Walter Küchenmeister, that declared the annexation of the Sudetenland in October 1938 as a further step on the way to a new world war. This leaflet was called Der Stoßtrupp or The Raiding Patrol, and condemned the Nazi government and argued against the government's propaganda. A document that was used at the trial of Schulze-Boysen indicated that only 40 to 50 copies of the leaflet were distributed.

=== Call for popular uprising ===
==== AGIS leaflets ====
From 1942 onwards, the group started to produce leaflets that were signed with AGIS in reference to the Spartan King Agis IV, who fought against corruption for his people. Naming the newspaper Agis, was originally a name chosen by Libertas Schulze-Boysen. The pamphlets had titles like, The becoming of the Nazi movement, Call for opposition, Freedom and violence and Appeal to All Callings and Organisations to resist the government. The writing of the AGIS leaflet series was a mix of Schulze-Boysen and Walter Küchenmeister, a communist political writer, who would often include copy from KPD members and through contacts.

They were often left in phone booths or selected addresses from the phone book. Extensive precautions were taken, including wearing gloves, using many different typewriters and destroying the carbon paper. John Graudenz also produced, running duplicate mimeograph machines in the apartment of Anna Krauss.

On 15 February 1942, the group wrote the large 6-page pamphlet called Die Sorge Um Deutschlands Zukunft geht durch das Volk! (Anxiety about Germany's future is moving through the people!). The master copy was arranged by the potter Cato Bontjes van Beek and the pamphlet was written up by Maria Terwiel on her typewriter, five copies at a time. The paper describes how the care of Germany's future is decided by the people... and called for the opposition to the war, the Nazis, all Germans who now threaten the future of all. A copy survives to the present day.

The text first analysed the current situation: contrary to the Nazi propaganda, most German armies were in retreat and the number of war dead was in the millions. Inflation, scarcity of goods, plant closures, labour agitation and corruption in State authorities were occurring all the time. Then the text examined German war crimes:

But the conscience of all true patriots rebels against the whole current form of German exercise of power in Europe. All who have retained their sense of genuine values see with a shudder how the good name of Germany is falling into disrepute under the swastika symbol. In all occupied countries today, hundreds, often thousands, of people are shot or hanged arbitrarily, without due process, people who can be accused of nothing other than of being loyal to their country [...] In the name of the Reich the most hideous tortures and atrocities are committed against civilians and prisoners. Never yet in history has a man been so hated as Adolf Hitler. The hatred of tortured humanity burdens the entire German people

==== The Soviet Paradise exhibition ====
In May 1942, Joseph Goebbels held a Nazi propaganda exhibition with the ironic name of The Soviet Paradise (German original title "Das Sowjet-Paradies") in Lustgarten, with the express purpose of justifying the invasion of the Soviet Union to the German people.

Both the Harnacks and Kuckhoffs spent half a day at the exhibition. For Greta Kuckhoff particularly and her friends, the most distressing aspect of the exhibition was the installation about SS measures against Russian "partisans" (Soviet partisans). The exhibition contained images of firing squads and bodies of young girls, some still children, who had been hanged and were dangling from ropes. The group decided to act. It was Fritz Thiel and his wife Hannelore who printed stickers using a child's toy rubber stamp kit. In a campaign initiated by John Graudenz on 17 May 1942, Schulze-Boysen, Marie Terwiel and nineteen others, mostly people from the group around Rittmeister, travelled across five Berlin neighbourhoods to paste the stickers over the original exhibition posters with the message:

Adhesive stickers that were posted on top of The Soviet Paradise posters

Permanent Exhibition
The Nazi Paradise
War, Hunger, Lies, Gestapo
How much longer?

The Harnacks were dismayed at Schulze-Boysen's actions and decided not to participate in the exploit, believing it to be reckless and unnecessarily dangerous.

On 18 May, Herbert Baum, a Jewish communist who had contact with the Schulze-Boysen group through Walter Husemann, delivered incendiary bombs to the exhibition in the hope of destroying it. Although 11 people were injured, the whole episode was covered up by the government, and the action lead to the arrest of 250 Jews including Baum himself. Following the action, Harnack asked the Kuckoffs to revisit the exhibition to determine whether any damage had been done to it, but they found little damage was visible.

The Schulze-Boysen and Harnack groups

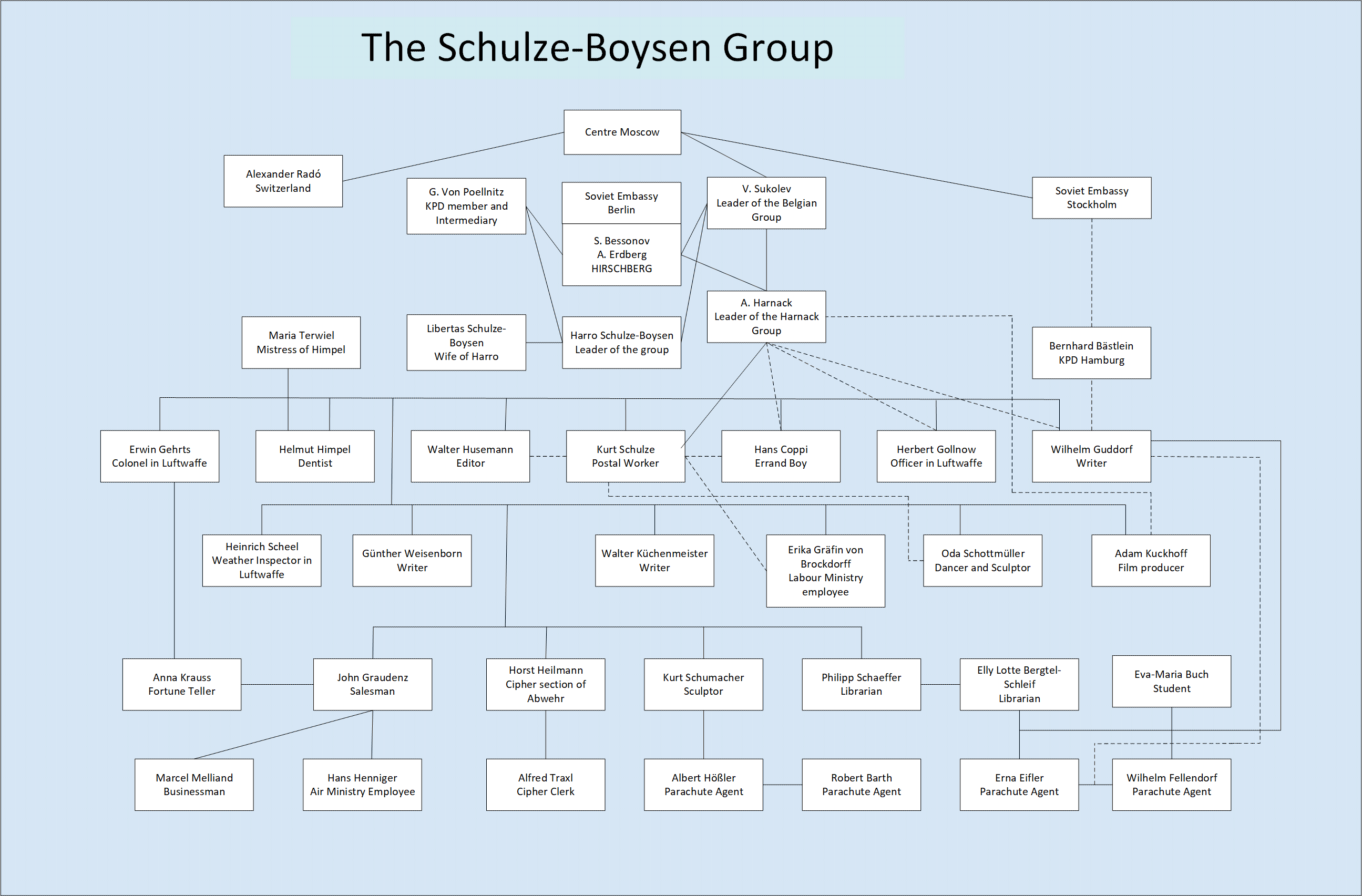
The Schulze Boysen Group

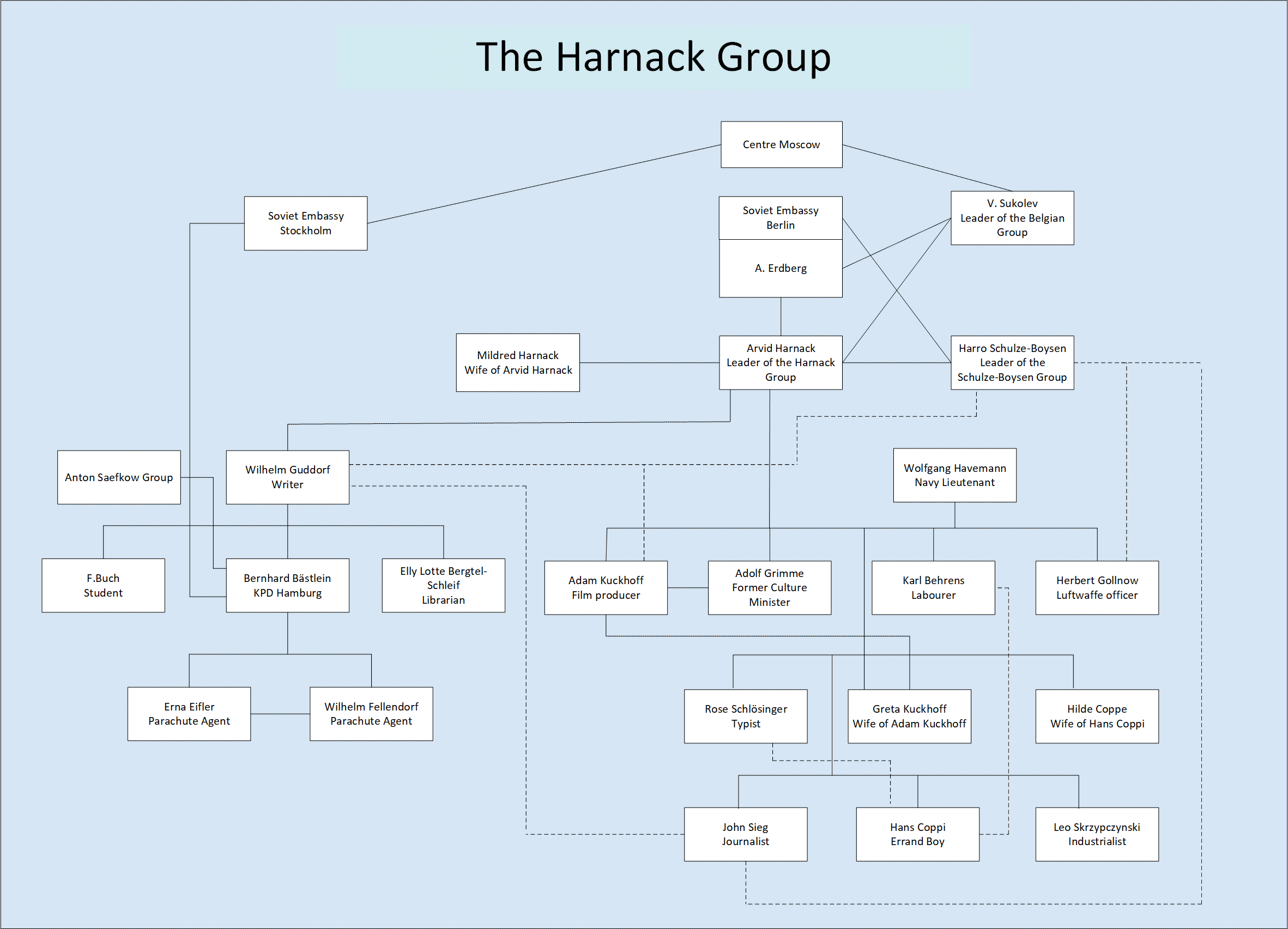
The Arvid Harnack Group

=== Acts of espionage ===
The Invasion of Poland on 1 September 1939, was seen as the beginning of the feared world war, but also as an opportunity to eliminate Nazi rule and to invoke a thorough transformation of German society. Hitler's victories in France and Norway in 1940 encouraged them to expect the replacement of the Nazi regime, above all from the Soviet Union, not from Western capitalism. They believed that the Soviet Union would keep Germany as a sovereign state after its victory and that they wanted to work towards a corresponding opposition without domination by the Communist Party of Germany.

Around 13 June 1941, Harro Schulze-Boysen prepared a report that gave the final details of the Soviet invasion including details of Hungarian airfields containing German planes. On 17 June, the People's Commissariat for State Security presented the report to Stalin, who harshly dismissed it as disinformation.

In December 1941, John Sieg published The Home Front (German:Die Innere Front) on a regular basis. It contained texts by Walter Husemann, Fritz Lange, Martin Weise and Herbert Grasse, including information about the economic situation in Europe, references to Moscow radio frequencies, and calls for resistance. It was produced in several languages for foreign forced labourers in Germany. Only one copy from August 1942 has survived. After the attack on the Soviet Union in June 1941, Hilde Coppi had secretly listened to Moscow radio in order to receive signs of life from German prisoners of war and to forward them to their relatives via Heinrich Scheel. This news contradicted the Nazi propaganda that the Red Army would murder all German soldiers who surrendered. In order to educate them about propaganda lies and Nazi crimes, the group copied and sent letters to soldiers on the Eastern Front, addressed to a fictitious police officer.

In autumn 1941 the eyewitness Erich Mirek reported to Walter Husemann about mass murders of Jews by the SS and SD in Pinsk. The group announced these crimes in their letters.

The Berlin group undoubtedly provided valuable intelligence to the Soviet Union. However, a Soviet memo dated 25 November 1941 and recently discovered by Shareen Blair Brysac, details the organisational problems in evaluating the intelligence. Reports were forwarded to Lavrentiy Beria, who was unable to act on their contents, which resulted in the Red Army being unable to form a cogent response. Ultimately, the groups' efforts had no effect on Soviet military strategy.

=== The von Scheliha Group ===
The cavalry officer, diplomat and later resistance fighter Rudolf von Scheliha was recruited by Soviet intelligence while in Warsaw in 1934. Although a member of the Nazi party since 1938, he took an increasingly critical stance against the Nazi regime by 1938 at the latest. He became an informant to journalist Rudolf Herrnstadt. Intelligence from von Scheliha would be sent to Herrnstadt, via the cutout Ilse Stöbe, who would then pass it to the Soviet embassy in Warsaw. In September 1939, Scheliha was appointed director of an information department in the Foreign Office, that was created to counter foreign press and radio news by creating propaganda about the German occupation policy in Poland. This necessitated a move back to Berlin, and Stöbe followed, attaining a position arranged by von Scheliha in the press section of the Foreign Office, that enabled her to pass documents from von Scheliha to a representative of TASS.

Von Scheliha's position in the information department exposed him to reports and images of Nazi atrocities, enabling him to verify the veracity of foreign reports of Nazi officials. By 1941, von Scheliha had become increasingly dissatisfied with the Nazi regime and began to resist by collaborating with Henning von Tresckow. Scheliha secretly made a collection of documents on the atrocities of the Gestapo, and in particular, on murders of Jews in Poland, documents which also contained photographs of newly established extermination camps. He informed his friends first before later attempting to notify the Allies, including a trip to Switzerland with information on Aktion T4 that was shared with Swiss diplomats. His later reports exposed the Final Solution. After Operation Barbarossa severed Soviet lines of communication in Berlin, Soviet intelligence made several attempts to reconnect with Stöbe in May 1942, but the effort failed.

=== Individuals and small groups ===
Other small groups and individuals, who knew little or nothing about each other, each resisted the National Socialists in their own way until the Gestapo arrested them and treated them as a common espionage organisation from 1942 to 1943.

- Kurt Gerstein was a German SS officer who had twice been sent to concentration camps in 1938 due to close links with the Confessional Church and had been expelled from the Nazi Party. As a mine manager and industrialist, Gerstein was convinced that he could resist by exerting influence inside the Nazi administration. On 10 March 1941, when he heard about the German euthanasia program Aktion T4, he joined the SS. Assigned to the Hygiene-Institut der Waffen-SS (Institute for Hygiene of the Waffen-SS), he was ordered by the RSHA to supply prussic acid to the Nazis. Gerstein set about finding methods to dilute the acid, but his main aim was to report the euthanasia programme to his friends. In August 1942, after attending a gassing using a diesel engine exhaust from a car, he informed the Swedish embassy in Berlin of what happened.
- Willy Lehmann was a communist sympathiser who was recruited by the Soviet NKVD in 1929 and became one of their most valuable agents. In 1932 Lehmann joined the Gestapo and reported to the NKVD the complete work of the Gestapo. In 1935 Lehmann attended a rocket engine ground firing test in Kummersdorf that was also attended by Wernher von Braun. From this Lehmann sent six pages of data to Stalin on 17 December 1935. Through Lehmann, Stalin also learned about the power struggles in the Nazi party, rearmament work and even the date of Operation Barbarossa. In October 1942 Lehmann was discovered by the Gestapo and murdered without trial. Lehmann had no connection to the Schulze-Boysen or Harnack group.

== Belgium ==
=== The Trepper Group ===
Belgium was a favourite place for Soviet espionage to establish operations before World War II as it was geographically close to the centre of Europe, provided good commercial opportunities between Belgium and the rest of Europe and most important of all, the Belgian government was indifferent to foreign espionage operations that were conducted as long as they were against foreign powers and not Belgium itself. The first Soviet agents to arrive in Belgium were technicians. The Red Army agent, communist agitator and radio specialist Johann Wenzel arrived in January 1936, to establish a base. However, the Belgian authorities refused him permission to remain, so he moved to the Netherlands in early 1937, where he made contact with Daniël Goulooze, who was director of the Communist Party of the Netherlands (CPN) and who acted as the main liaison officer between the CPN and the Communist International in Moscow.

Leopold Trepper was an agent of the Red Army Intelligence and had been working with Soviet intelligence since 1930. Trepper along with Soviet military intelligence officer, Richard Sorge were the two main Soviet agents in Europe and were employed as roving agents setting up espionage networks in Europe and Japan. Whereas Richard Sorge was a penetration agent, Trepper ran a series of clandestine cells for organising agents. Trepper used the latest technology, in the form of small wireless radios to communicate with Soviet intelligence. Although the monitoring of the radios transmissions by the Funkabwehr would eventually lead to the organisations destruction, the sophisticated use of the technology enabled the organisation to behave as a network.

During the 1930s, Trepper had worked to create a large pool of informal intelligence sources, through contacts with the French Communist Party. In 1936, Trepper became the technical director of Soviet Red Army Intelligence in Western Europe. He was responsible for recruiting agents and creating espionage networks. During early 1938, he was sent to Brussels to establish commercial cover for a spy network in France and the Low Countries. In the autumn of 1938, Trepper approached a Jewish businessman and former Comintern agent Léon Grossvogel, whom he had known in Palestine. Grossvogel ran a small business called Le Roi du Caoutchouc or The Raincoat King on behalf of its owners. Trepper had a plan to use money that had been provided to him to create a business that would be the export division of The Raincoat King. The new business was given an unidiomatic name of Foreign Excellent Raincoat Company. Trepper's plan was to wait until the company gained market share, and then when it was of sufficient size, infiltrate it with communist personal in positions such as shareholders, business managers and department heads. On 6 March 1939, Trepper, now using the alias Adam Mikler, a wealthy Canadian businessman, moved, with his wife, to Brussels to make it his new base.

In March 1939, Trepper was joined by GRU agent Mikhail Makarov posing as Carlos Alamo, who was to provide expertise in forged documentation e.g. preparation of Kennkartes. However, Grossvogel had recruited Abraham Rajchmann, a criminal forger, to the group and thenceforth Makarov became a radio operator. In July 1939, Trepper was joined in Brussels by GRU agent Anatoly Gurevich posing as the wealthy Uruguayan Vincente Sierra. Gurevich had already completed his first operation by meeting Schulze-Boysen in order to reestablish him as an intelligence source and to arrange courier service. Gurevich's original remit was to learn the operation of the raincoat company and establish a new store in Copenhagen.

The Trepper and Gurevich groups in Belgium

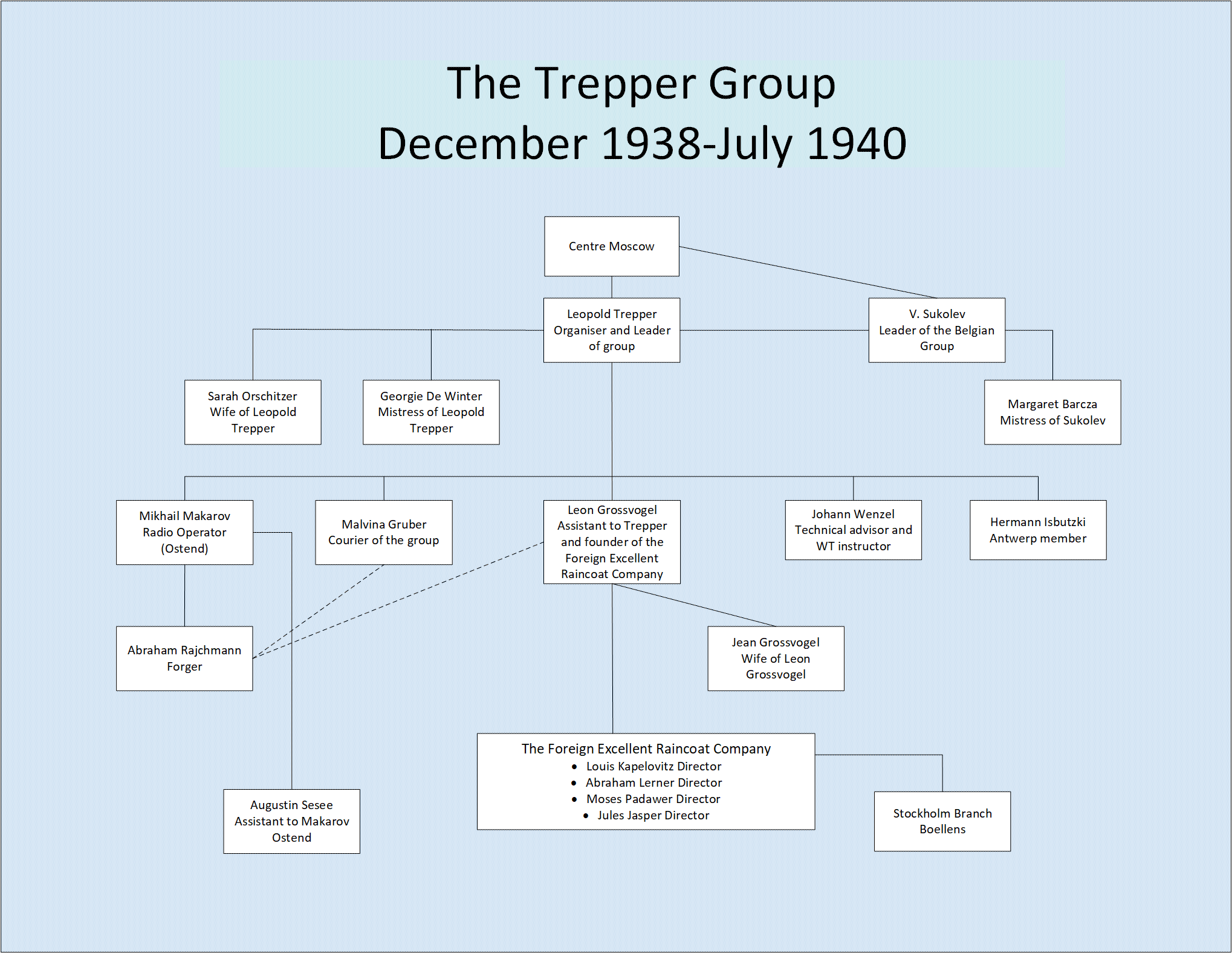
Leopold Trepper group from December 1938 to July 1940

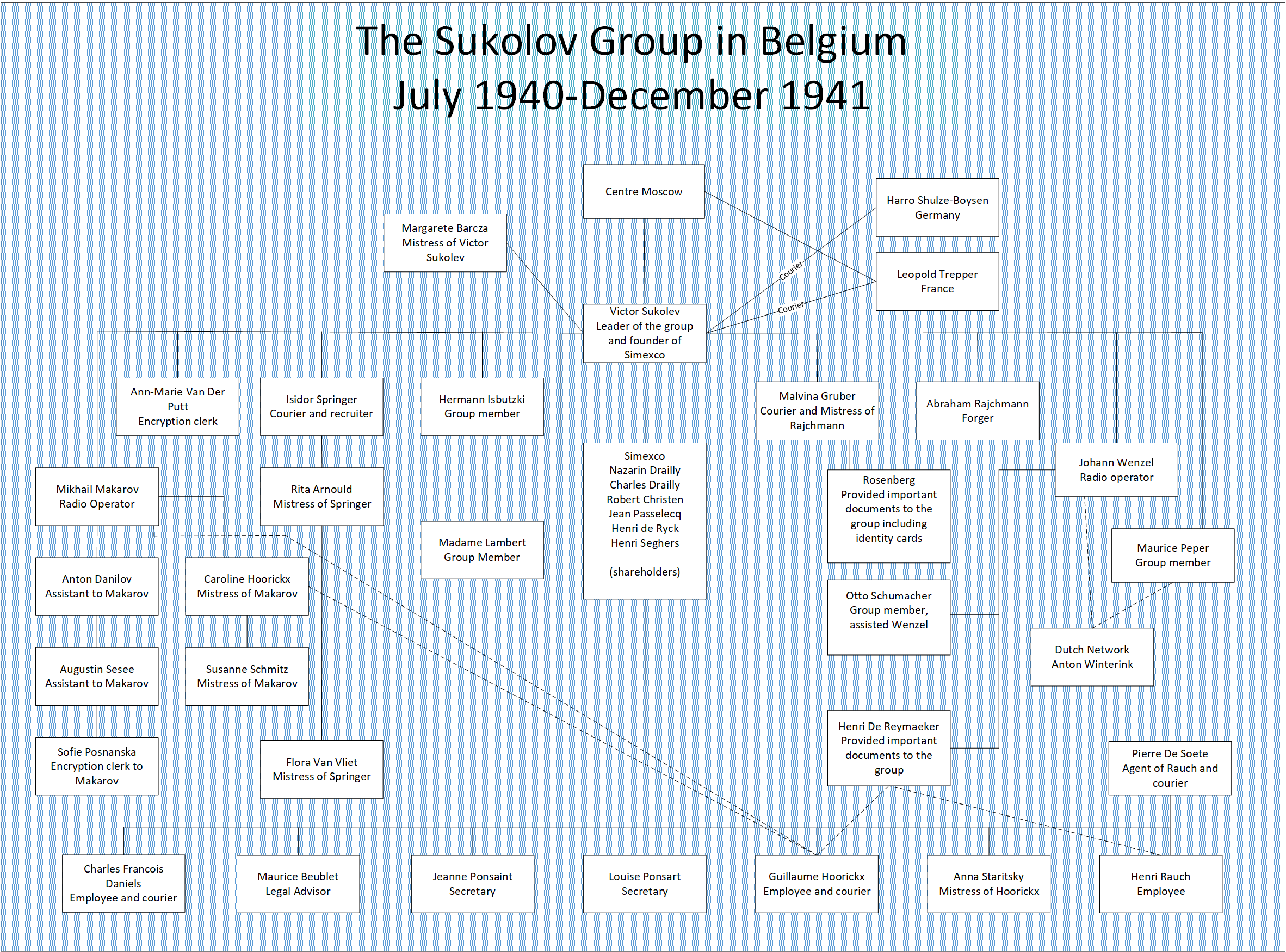
Gurevich group in Belgium between July 1940 to December 1941 in Belgium

==== Wartime activity ====
At the start of the war, Trepper had to revise his plans significantly. After the conquest of Belgium in May 1940, Trepper fled to Paris, leaving Gurevich responsible for the Belgium network. Gurevich, operating from a safehouse located at 101 Rue des Atrébates in Brussels, used Makarov as his wireless radio operator, Sophia Poznańska as his cipher clerk, Rita Arnould as a courier and housekeeper, and Isidor Springer, who worked as a courier between Gurevich and Trepper and as a recruiter. Gurevich's main task was to transmit reports received from Harro Schulze-Boysen and Trepper. In June 1941, Trepper sent Anton Danilov to assist Makarov (Note: According to Kesaris p.271 much of the information provided by Perrault 1969 is incorrect and contradictory.) with radio transmissions. In October 1941 Gurevich visited Germany to reestablish communications with the Shulze-Boysen/Harnack group and then to deliver a cipher key to Ilse Stöbe that was instead delivered to Kurt Schulze. In September or October 1941, Trepper ordered Rajchmann to join Gurevich as the group's documentation expert. The last core member of the group was the courier, Malvina Gruber. Gruber specialised in couriering people, often across borders. Her main role with the group was as a courier between Rajchmann and Trepper and as an assistant to Rajchmann.

On 13 December 1941, the apartment at Rue Des Atrebates was raided by the Abwehr. (Note: A linking paragraph. Details of the discovery of the group are provided in Persecution by Nazi authorities.) Gurevich was saved as Trepper warned him. All other members of the house were arrested. A complete photographic laboratory, along with a quantity of counterfeit identify cards and plain-text and ciphered text were confiscated in the raid. The following morning, Makarov was arrested returning to house with new messages to transmit.

=== The Jeffremov Group ===
This network was run by Soviet Army Captain Konstantin Jeffremov. He arrived in Brussels in March 1939 to organise various groups into a network. Jeffremov's group was independent of Trepper's group, although there were some members who worked for both and it was likely that by 1941, Jeffremov knew about Gurevich's network.

Jeffremov's most important agent was the Belgian Edouard Van der Zypen, who worked at Henschel & Son, a manufacturing company in Kassel that made aircraft and tanks. His other recruits were Maurice Peper and Elizabeth Depelsenaire. Peper was a professional radio operator who was recruited into the network in 1940 and became the main liaison between Belgium and Amsterdam. After the reorganisation, he worked as the cutout between Jeffremov and Rajchmann. Depelsenaire was responsible for her own sub-group, which provided safe accommodation in the Brussels area. Anton Winterink worked for Jeffremov for most of 1940 in Brussels but made frequent trips to the Netherlands where he established another network. Later in 1940, Jeffremov ordered Winterink to take charge of the network, that became known as group Hilda. By December 1940, both Wenzel in Belgium and Winterink in the Netherlands had established a radio link with Moscow that was being used to transmit intelligence provided by Jeffremov. In 1939, the married couple, Franz and Germaine Schneider were recruited by Jeffremov. The couple were members of the Communist Party of Belgium and had been running Communist International (Comintern) safe houses in Brussels. For a number of years Germaine Schneider was the most important of the two, working as a courier from 1939 to 1942 that involved extensive travel across the Low Countries. Before the war, she was Henry Robinson's contact to Soviet agents in Great Britain. While she worked for Jeffremov, she couriered between Brussels and Paris.

In May 1942, as part of a reorganisation effort after the raid on the Rue des Atrebates safehouse, Trepper met Jeffremov in Brussels to instruct him to take over the running of the Belgian espionage network in the absence of Anatoly Gurevich who had run the network from July 1940 to December 1941. The most important aspect of Jeffremov's new commission was to ensure the continued transmission of the intelligence they were receiving from the Schulze-Boysen/Harnack group. This information was forwarded to Soviet intelligence via a French Communist Party radio transmitter. Jeffremov was frequently admonished by Soviet intelligence for his lack of activity and slow production of quality intelligence. In May 1942, following Makarov's arrest, Wenzel agreed to begin transmitting for Jeffremov and operated out of a safehouse at 12 Rue de Namur in Brussels.

On 30 July 1942, the house at 12 Rue de Namur was raided by the Abwehr and Wenzel was arrested. Germaine Schneider managed to warn Trepper, who warned Jeffremov, who managed to escape.

The two Jeffremov groups from 1939 to 1942 and Group Hilda in the Netherlands

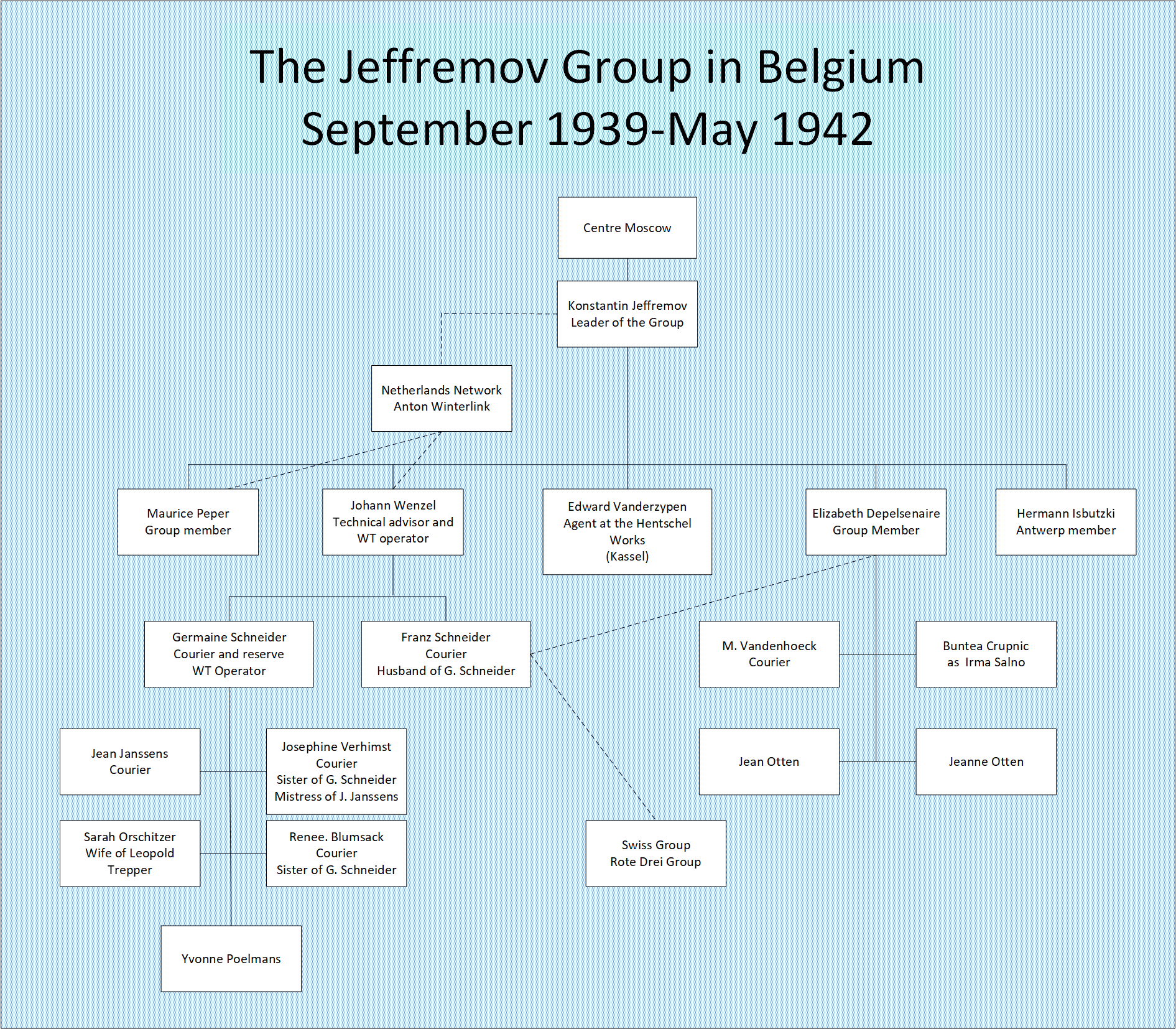
Organisational diagram of the first Jeffremov Group

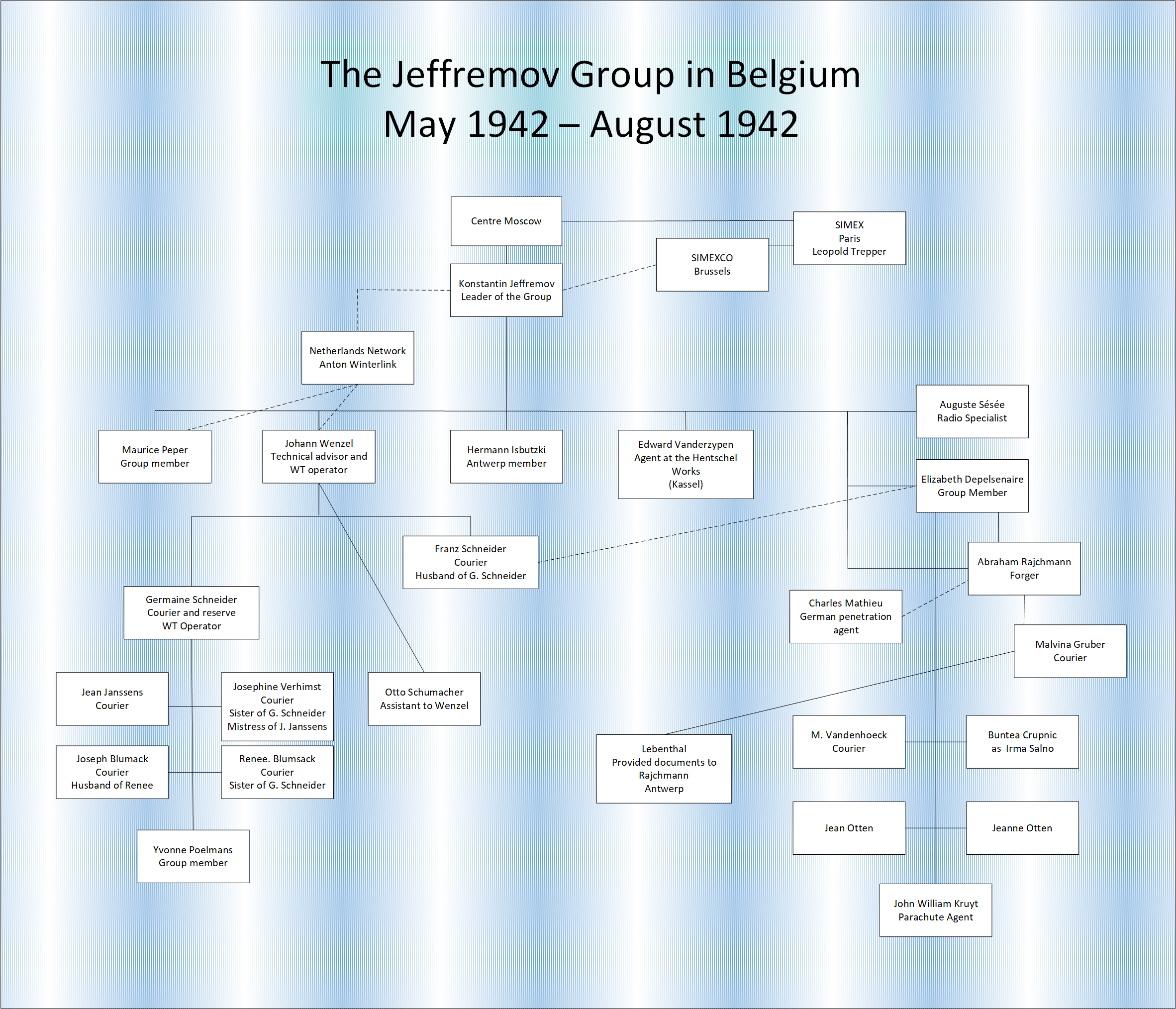
Organisational diagram of the second Jeffremov Group

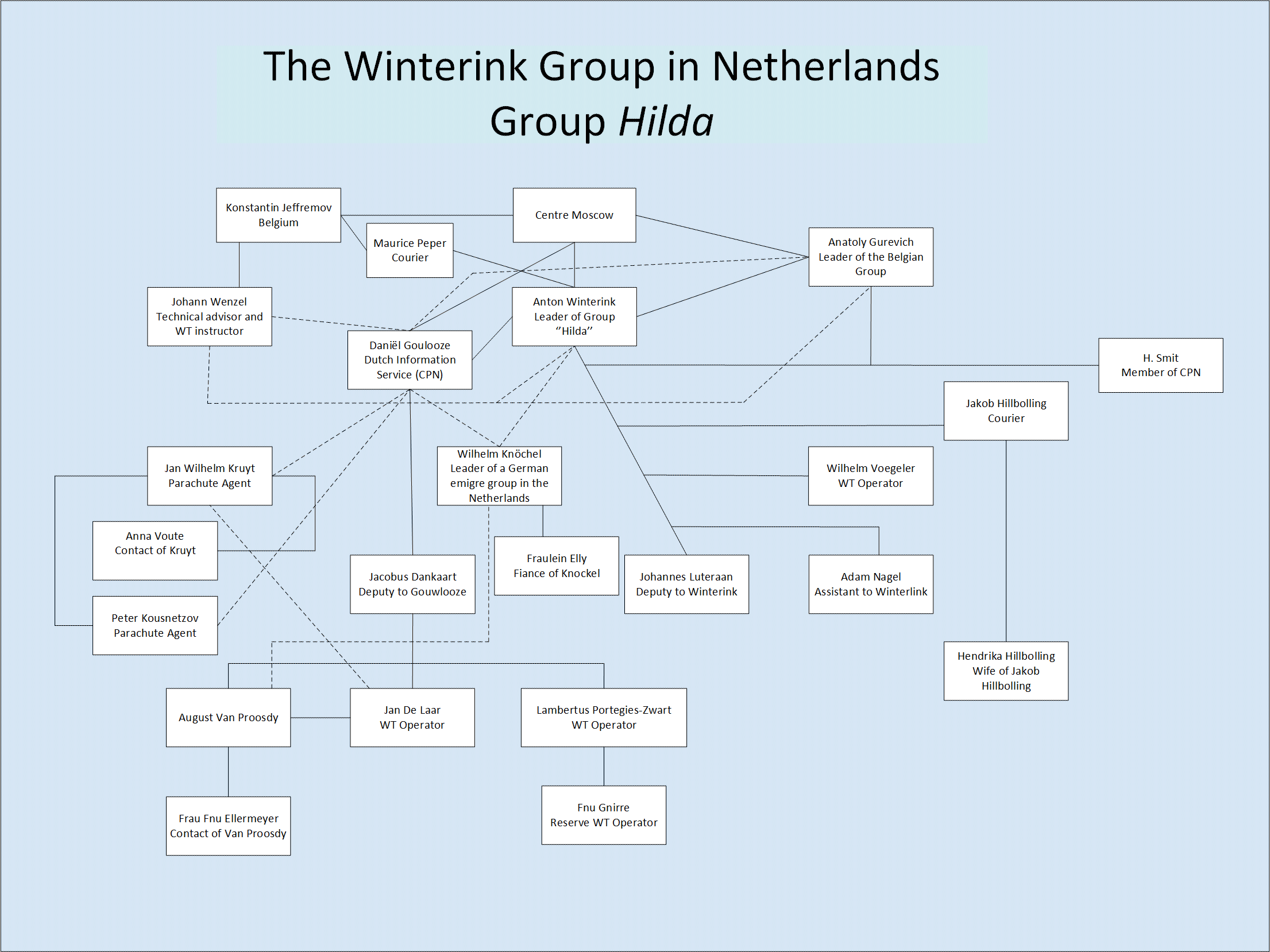
Organisation diagram of the Winterink Group in the Netherlands

== Netherlands ==
=== Dutch Information Service ===
In 1935, Dutch Comintern member Daniël Goulooze established the clandestine Dutch Information Service (DIS), an intelligence organisation to collect information for consumption by Soviet intelligence. In 1937, Goulooze was sent for intelligence training to the Soviet Union. When he returned, he became the main rezident (резиде́нт) agent for the Netherlands. In the years leading up to the war, Goulooze had contacts with the KPD officials in Berlin and Comintern members in the Low Countries, France and Great Britain. In 1937, Goulooze established a wireless telegraphy connection between the Comintern in Amsterdam and the Soviet Union.

In October 1937, Johann Wenzel contacted Goulooze in Amsterdam and they discussed plans for the construction of a radio network in Belgium. At the end of 1938, Wenzel again visited Goulooze, to recruit Dutch national and Rote Hilfe member Anton Winterink. By September 1939, Wenzel had trained Winterink as a radio operator, in Brussels. Winterink subsequently became the radio operator for the Jeffremov group in Belgium. In the lead up to the war, Wenzel continued to recruit Dutch communists from Goulooze, for the Jeffremov group. In October 1939, Gurevich visited Goulooze to request help to build his espionage network in Belgium. Gurevich asked that a temporary wireless telegraphy link be established for his use, while he established his own wireless telegraphy link. This was used until January 1940.

As the war progressed and the other communist organisations were destroyed, the DIS became increasingly important to Soviet intelligence as the only organisation in Western Europe that could maintain contact with Soviet agents on the ground. Such was the level of communication Goulooze conducted with Soviet intelligence, that he maintained four separate and active wireless telegraphy sets and one in reserve.

=== Knöchel Emigre group ===
In 1940, it was decided by the Comintern that various KPD sections (Abschnittsleitungen) in Germany should be amalgamated into a single operational section, that was to be led by German KPD organiser Wilhelm Knöchel. (Note: Wilhelm Knöchel is identified as Alfred Knöchel in Kesaris page 71, section IV. "Alfred" was Knöchel's alias.) The Comintern decided the planning stage for the operation would be done in Amsterdam. From mid-1940, Knöchel with the assistance of Goulooze began to train the emigre group of communists in the Netherlands, to work in Germany as political activists, informers and instructors. Goulooze was able to obtain blank identity cards, along with official stamps to enable the KPD members who were in hiding, to interact with CPN members in Amsterdam and to travel safely to Germany.

In January 1941, the first Comintern instructor Alfons Kaps travelled to Berlin, followed by Willi Seng, then Albert Kamradt and Alfred Kowalke. On 9 January 1942, Knöchel travelled to Berlin. Goulooze arranged for everything that was published by the Comintern executive in Moscow, to be couriered to Knöchel in Berlin.

== France ==
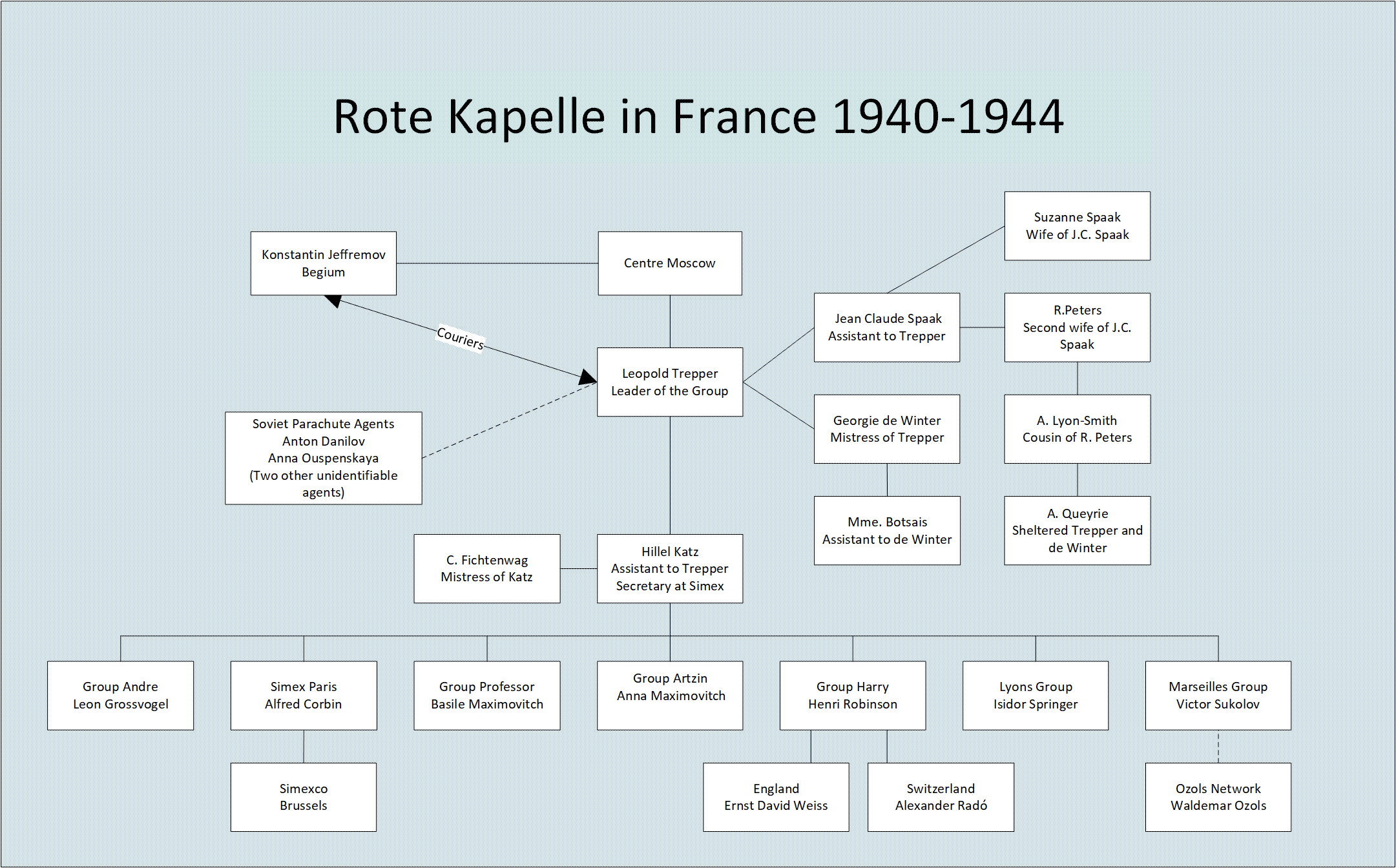
The Rote Kapelle in France between 1940 and 1944. This diagrams details the seven networks run by Leopold Trepper

In Paris, Trepper's assistants were Grossvogel and Polish Jew Hillel Katz, who was the group's recruiter. Trepper contacted General Ivan Susloparov, Soviet Military attaché in the Vichy government, both in an attempt to reconnect with Soviet intelligence and locate another transmitter. Trepper came under the supervision of Susloparov who charged him with building an espionage network that targeted military intelligence. After passing his intelligence to Susloparov, Trepper started to organise a new cover company by recruiting Belgian businessman Nazarin Drailly. On 19 March 1941, Drailly became the main shareholder in the Simexco company, located in Brussels. Trepper also created a similar company in Paris that was known as Simex and was run by former Belgian diplomat Jules Jaspar along with French commercial director Alfred Corbin. Trepper who used the alias Jean Gilbert, a Frenchman was also a director of the firm. Both companies sold black market goods to the Germans but their best customer was Organisation Todt, the civil and military engineering organisation of Nazi Germany. The two firms gave Trepper access to industrialists and businessmen, but he was always careful to remain in the background in any deal but ensured that suitable questions were asked and that he dealt only with people in responsible positions.

Around 1930, Comintern agent Henry Robinson arrived in Paris and became the section leader for Switzerland, France, and Great Britain, to conduct intelligence gathering operations against France, Germany, Switzerland, Belgium, and Great Britain. In 1930, Robinson became director of BB-Aparat (intelligence department) of the French Communist Party and the International Liaison Department (OMS) of the Comintern in Western Europe.

Towards the end of 1940 and during all of 1941, Trepper searched for a radio operator in France, as a backup communications link should Makarov be arrested. In the spring of 1941, the Polish couple, Harry and Mira Sokol were recruited and trained as radio operators by Leon Grossvogel.

In September 1941, on orders from Soviet intelligence, Trepper met with Robinson in Paris. While Trepper was an agent of Red Army intelligence, Robinson was a Comintern agent. Robinson and the Comintern had lost prestige with Stalin, who suspected it of deviating from Communist norms. Robinson was also suspected of being an agent of the Deuxième Bureau, so subsequently he was in ideological conflict with Soviet intelligence. Therefore, it was unusual for two senior agents to meet, but an exception was made as it was felt by Soviet intelligence that Robinson's extensive contacts could help Trepper build his French networks.

Prior to September 1941, Robinson sent his intelligence via a cutout who took them to the Soviet Embassy in Paris, where they were conveyed by diplomatic pouch to the Soviet Union. After meeting Trepper, Robinson arranged to receive his messages via Makarov. When Makarov was arrested in December 1941, it resulted in a complete loss of communications for the Trepper and Robinson networks. Trepper was unable to make contact with Soviet intelligence until February 1942, when he learned from Robinson of a radio transmitter that was being run by the French Communist Party in Paris and was ordered to take charge of Robinson's network.

The Sokols began transmitting in April 1942, in a house at Maisons-Laffitte, to the north of Paris. After the arrests in Belgium by the Sonderkommando Rote Kapelle, the Sokols became the group's sole radio operator. Because of the high volume of intelligence being sent, their transmissions were detected by the Funkabwehr. On 9 June 1942, the Sokols were arrested at the house. After the Sokol's arrest, Trepper switched to using Wenzel's transmitter in Brussels. However, that connection only lasted slightly longer than one month, as Wenzel was arrested on 30 July 1942. Trepper then used a transmitter belonging to the French Communist Party, to forward his reports. Pierre and Lucienne Giraud were used to courier the reports between Grossvogel and the French Communist Party in Paris. In the autumn of 1942, Trepper authorised Grossvogel to establish a new station at a house in Le Pecq but the transmitter failed to work. The Gestapo arrived shortly after the group was established and discovered the transmitter buried in the garden.

In December 1942 Robinson was arrested in Paris by the Sonderkommando Rote Kapelle. Trepper and Gurevich, were arrested on 9 November 1942 in Marseille.

=== The seven networks ===
Trepper directed seven networks in France and each had its own group leader with a focus on gathering a specific type of intelligence. Trepper constructed them in a manner so that they were independent, working in parallel with only the group leader having direct contact with Trepper. Regular meeting places were used for contact points at predetermined times and these could only be set by Trepper. This type of communication meant that Trepper could contact the group leader but not vice versa and stringent security measures were built in at every step. These were as follows:

Espionage networks in France
Group	Contact	Responsibility	Comment
Andre	Leon Grossvogel	Intelligence on the German economy and industry	As part of his remit, Grossvogel was responsible for finding safe houses, rendezvous points for other networks and letter drop locations.
Harry	Henry Robinson	Intelligence from French military and political groups, from within the Deuxième Bureau and within Vichy intelligence, from the Central Committee of the French Communist Party, from Gaullist groups and from UK groups.	His other task was the control of the wireless equipment and communication needs of the espionage network.
Professor	Basile Maximovitch	Intelligence from White Russians emigrant groups as well as from groups in the German Wehrmacht.	Maximovitch was a former Russian mining engineer who had offered his allegiance to Trepper. He was particularly important to him as the niece of German general Carl-Heinrich von Stülpnagel, Margarete Hoffman-Scholz fell in love with Maximovitch. At the time, von Stülpnagel was Commander of Greater Paris, later Commander of German occupied France. This gave Maximovitch access to intelligence that came from the German High Command.
Artzin	Anna Maximovitch	Intelligence from French clerical and royalists groups. They also had a special arrangement with Bishop Emanuel-Anatole-Raphaël Chaptal de Chanteloup of Paris	Anna Maximovitch was the sister of Basile Maximovitch. Her profession as a neurologist enabled her to open a clinic in Choisy-le-Roi, a moneyed area of Paris which enabled her to pick up gossip and recruit from her patients.
Simex	Alfred Corbin	Intelligence from German administrative departments and industrial firms as well as provided the financing for the Trepper organisation. It was the Simex company.	Communication between the Simex company and its main customer, the Todt Organization, provided information on German military fortifications and troop movements. As a bonus, the Todt Organization supplied some of Trepper's agents with passes that allowed them to move freely in German-occupied areas.
Romeo	Isidore Springer	Intelligence from US and Belgian diplomats.	It was primarily concerned with recruitment and acting as a courier between different groups in different countries.
Sierra	Anatoly Gurevich	Intelligence from groups associated with French admiral François Darlan and French general Henri Giraud.	The group also had contacts with the French government and administrative departments of France.

== Switzerland ==
=== Rote Drei ===
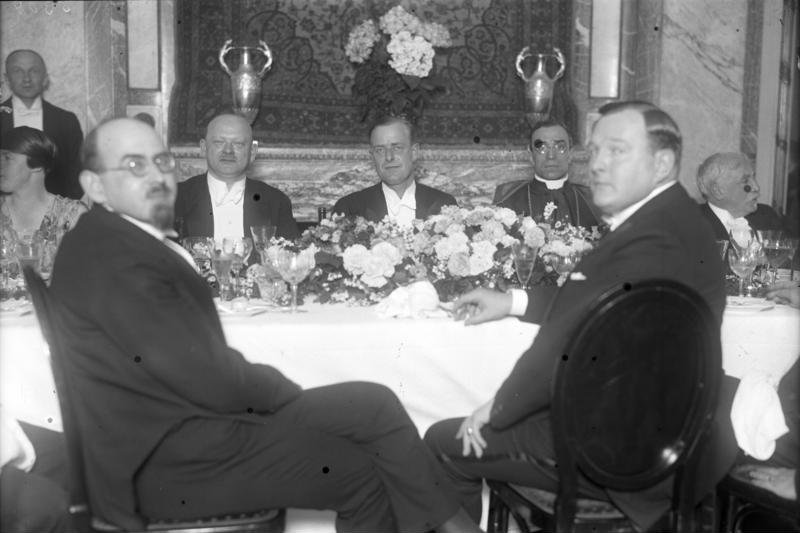
Georges Blun in the middle back row

The Red Three (German: Rote Drei) was a Soviet espionage network that operated in Switzerland during and after World War II. It was perhaps the most important Soviet espionage network in the war, as they could work relatively undisturbed. The name Rote Drei was a German appellation, based on the number of transmitters or operators serving the network, and is perhaps misleading, as at times there were four, sometimes even five.

The head of the Soviet intelligence service was Maria Josefovna Poliakova, a Soviet 4th Department agent, who first arrived in Switzerland in 1937 to direct operations. The other important leader in the Switzerland group was Ursula Kuczynski, codenamed Sonia, a colonel of the GRU, who has been sent to Switzerland in late 1938, to recruit a new espionage network of agents that would infiltrate Germany. Poliakova passed control to the new director of the Soviet intelligence service in Switzerland, sometime between 1939 and 1940. The new director was Alexander Radó, codenamed Dora, who held the secret Red Army rank of Major General.

Radó formed several intelligence groups in France and Germany, before arriving in Switzerland in late 1936 with his family. In 1936 Radó formed Geopress, a news agency specialising in maps and geographic information as a cover for intelligence work, and after the outbreak of the Spanish Civil War, the business began to flourish. In 1940, Radó met Alexander Foote, an English Soviet agent, who joined Ursula Kuczynski's network in 1938, and who would become the most important radio operator for Radó's network. In March 1942, Radó made contact with Rudolf Roessler who would become the most important source of information. Roessler was able to provide prompt access to the secrets of the German High Command. This included the pending details of Operation Barbarossa, the invasion of the Soviet Union and many more, over a period of two years. A 1949 study by MI5 concluded that Roessler was a true mercenary who demanded payments for his reports that ran into thousands of Swiss francs over the course of the war years. This resulted in Dübendorfer being continually short of money, as Soviet intelligence insisted the link be maintained.

Radó established three networks in Switzerland. The three main sources of information, in decreasing importance:

- The first network was run by Rachel Dübendorfer, codename Sissy and who had the most important contacts of the three subgroups. Dübendorfer received intelligence reports from Rudolf Roessler (Lucy) via the cutout, Christian Schneider. Dübendorfer passed the reports to Radó who passed them to Foote for transmission. Roessler in turn received the information from sources whose aliases were named Werther, Teddy, Olga, and Anna.
- The second network was run by the French journalist Georges Blun (Long). His sources could not match the production of Lucy's group in quality or quantity but were nevertheless important.
- The third espionage network was led by Swiss journalist Otto Pünter (Pakbo). Pünter's network was considered the least important.

The three principal agents above were chiefly an organisation for producing intelligence for the Soviet Union. But some of the information that was collected for the Rote Drei was sent to the west through a Czech Colonel, Karel Sedláček. In 1935, Sedláček was trained in Prague for a year in 1935, and sent to Switzerland in 1937 by General František Moravec. By 1938, Sedláček was a friend of Major Hans Hausamann who was Director of the unofficial Buero Ha, then a covert arm of the Swiss Intelligence disguised as a press-cuttings agency. In the summer of 1939, Hausamann has been introduced to Rudolf Roessler by Xaver Schnieper, a junior officer in the Bureau and invited Roessler to work for Swiss intelligence. It was unknown whether Hausamann was passing information to Roessler, who passed it to Sedláček who forwarded it to London Czechs in exile, or via an intermediary.

Organisations of the Rote Drei groups

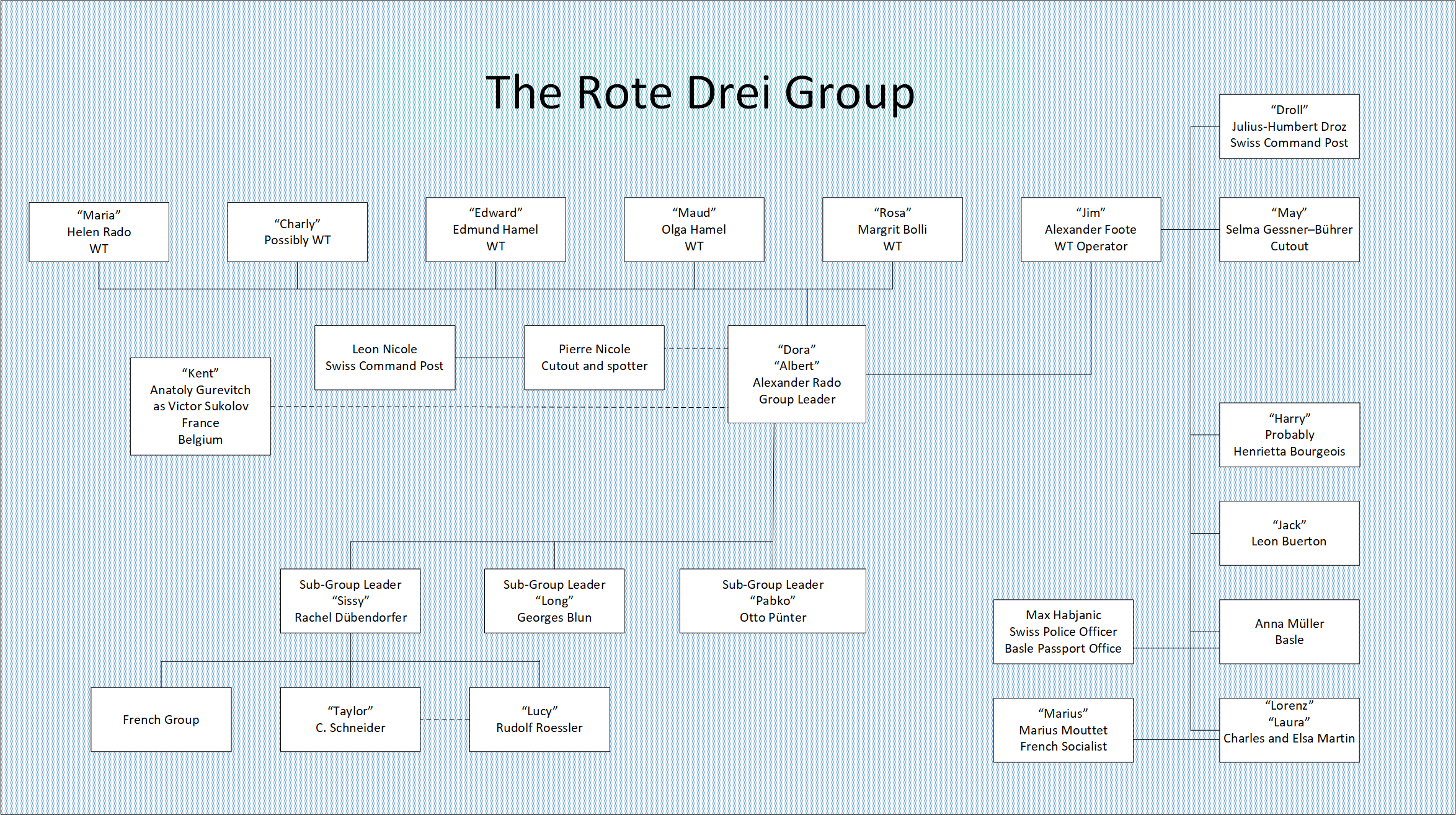
Organisational diagram of the Rote Drei that was run by Alexander Radó

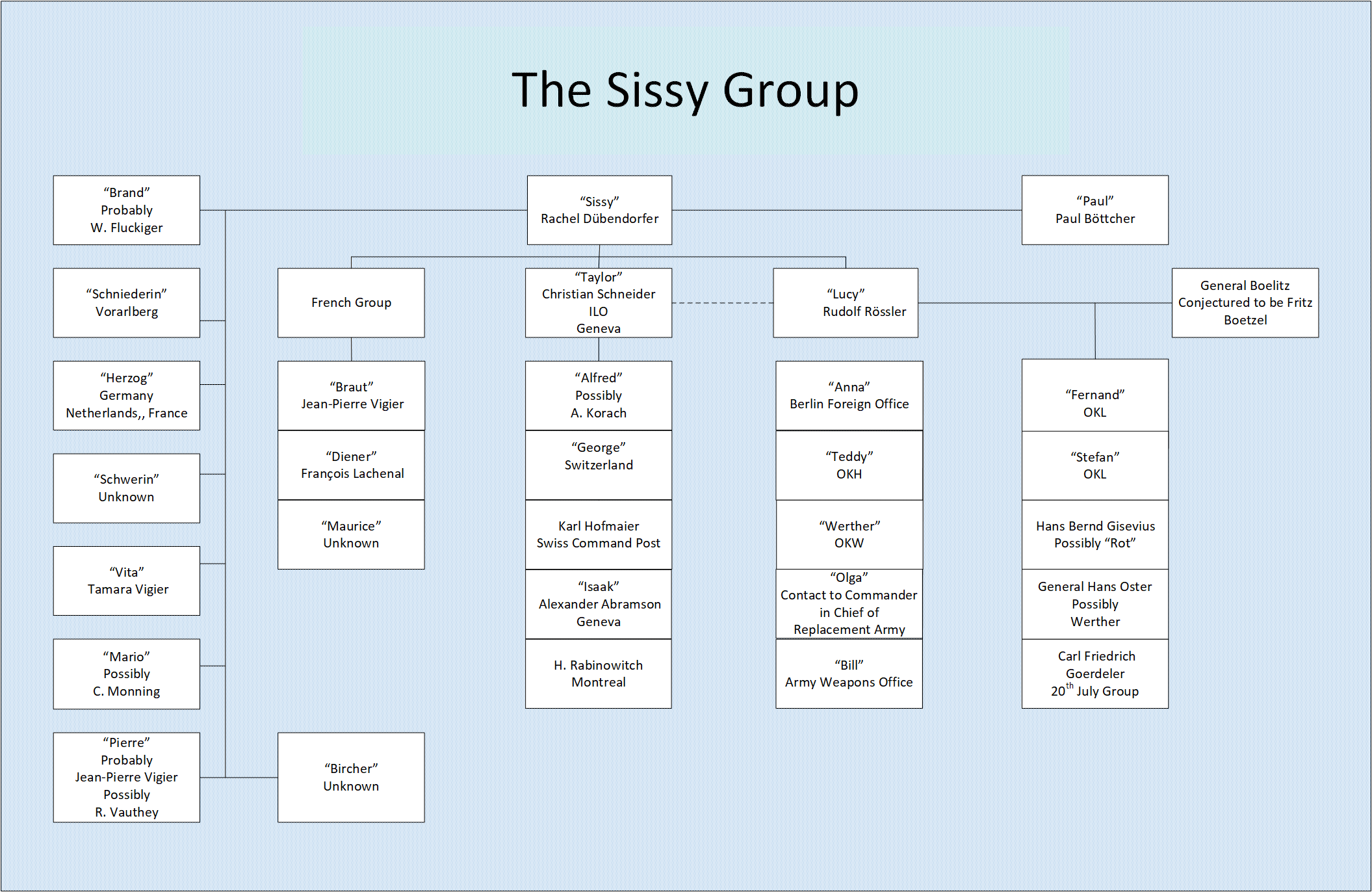
Organisational diagram of the core members of the Sissy group, run by Rachel Dübendorfer

==== Radio messages examined ====
The radio stations that were known to exist were established at:

- A station built by Geneva radio dealer Edmond Hamel codenamed Eduard and hidden behind a board in his apartment at Route de Florissant 192a in Geneva. Hamel's wife, who acted as an assistant, prepared the encrypted messages. Radó paid the couple 1000 Swiss francs per month.
- A station built in Geneva by Radó's lover, the waitress Marguerite Bolli at Rue Henri Mussard 8. She earned 800 Swiss francs per month.
- The third station, which was hidden insider a typewriter, was built by Alexander Foote. The transmitter was located in Lausanne at Chemin de Longeraie 2. Red Army Captain Foote was paid 1300 francs per month.

Wilhelm F. Flicke, a cryptanalyst at the Cipher Department of the High Command of the Wehrmacht, worked on the message traffic created by the Swiss group during World War II. Flicke estimated some 5500 messages or about five a day for three years were transmitted. The Trepper Report states that between 1941 and 1943, traffic from the three subgroups between 1941 and 1943 consisted of over 2000 militarily important messages, that were sent to the GRU Central office. In September 1993, the CIA Library also undertook an analysis of traffic throughput and estimated that a reasonable number would be around 5000 for the period it was in operation.

==== Roessler's sources in World War II ====
Roessler's value to the Soviet Union lay entirely in the great quantity of high-quality intelligence that he obtained and that played such a decisive part in the Soviet victory at the Battle of Kursk. Around 12,000 typed pages were sourced from the German High Command of planned operations on the Eastern Front. Roessler was often able to deliver accurate intelligence, often within 24 hours of the orders being issued. For instance, a German army commander found a copy of his own orders in the Red Army headquarters building in the Polish town of Łomża when his unit occupied it after wresting it from the Russians. This was reported to the German high command, yet they were unable to find the leak. It was never discovered who they were. The four sources whose codenames were Werther, Teddy, Olga, and Anna were responsible for 42.5 per cent of the intelligence sent from Switzerland to the Soviet Union.

The search for the identity of those sources has created a very large body of work of varying quality and offering various conclusions. Several theories can be dismissed immediately including by Foote and several other writers that the code names reflected the sources' access type rather than their identity, for example that Werther stood for Wehrmacht, Olga for Oberkommando der Luftwaffe, Anna for Auswärtiges Amt (Foreign Office) as the evidence does not support it. Alexander Radó made this claim in his memoirs, that were examined in a Der Spiegel article. Three and a half years before his death, Roessler described the identity of the four sources to a confidant. They were a German major who was in charge of the Abwehr before Wilhelm Canaris, Hans Bernd Gisevius, Carl Goerdeler and a General Boelitz, who was then deceased.

The most reliable study by the CIA Historical Review Program concluded that of the four sources, the most important source was Werther. The study stated he was likely Wehrmacht General Hans Oster, other Abwehr officers working with Swiss intelligence, or Swiss intelligence on its own. There was no evidence to link the other three codenames to known individuals. The CIA believed that the German sources gave their reports to Swiss General Staff, who in turn supplied Roessler with information that the Swiss wanted to pass to the Soviets.

== Networking ==
=== Berliners with foreign representatives ===
From 1933 to December 1941, the Harnacks had contact with the US Embassy counsellor Donald R. Heath and Martha Dodd, the daughter of the then US Ambassador William Dodd. The Harnacks would often attend receptions at the American embassy as well as parties organised by Martha Dodd, until about 1937. As like-minded people, the group believed that the population would revolt against the Nazis and when it did not, the group became convinced that new avenues were needed to defeat Hitler. From the summer of 1935, Harnack worked on economic espionage for the Soviet Union, and economic espionage for the United States by November 1939. Harnack was convinced that America would play a part in defeating Nazi Germany.

In September 1940, Alexander Korotkov acting under his codename of "Alexander Erdberg", a Soviet intelligence officer who was part of the Soviet Trade Delegation in Berlin, won over Arvid Harnack as a spy for the Soviet Embassy. Harnack had been an informant but in a meeting with Korotkov in the Harnacks' top floor apartment at Woyrschstrasse in Berlin and later in a meeting arranged by Erdberg in the Soviet Embassy to ensure he was not a decoy, he finally convinced Harnack, who was reluctant to agree. Several reasons have been advanced as to why Harnack decided to become a spy, including a need for money, being ideologically driven, and possibly blackmail by Russian intelligence. It was known that Harnack had planned an independent existence for his friends. According to a statement by Erdberg discovered after the war, he thought Harnack was not motivated by money nor ideologically driven but that he was specifically building an anti-fascist organisation for Germany as opposed to an espionage network for Russian intelligence. He considered himself a German patriot.

In February 1937, Schulze-Boysen had compiled a short information document about a sabotage enterprise planned in Barcelona by the German Wehrmacht. It was action from "Special Staff W", an organisation established by Luftwaffe general Helmuth Wilberg to study and analyse the tactical lessons learned by the Legion Kondor during the Spanish Civil War. A cousin to Schulze-Boysen, Gisela von Pöllnitz, placed the document in the mailbox of the Soviet Embassy in Bois de Boulogne.

In April 1939, Anatoly Gurevich was ordered to visit Berlin and attempt to revive Schulze-Boysen as a source. He arrived in Berlin on 29 October 1939 and arranged a meeting, first with Kurt Schulze, the radio operator for Ilse Stöbe and then Schulze-Boysen. At the meeting, Schulze-Boysen confirmed there would be no attack on the Soviet Union that year, that Germany did not have enough oil to conduct the war fully. Gurevich persuaded Schulze-Boysen to recruit other people as sources. From 26 September 1940, Harnack passed on knowledge received from Schulze-Boysen about the planned attack on the Soviet Union to Korotkov, but not about the open and branched structure of his group of friends. By 1941, Schulze-Boysen had succeeded in creating his own network. In March 1941, Schulze-Boysen informed Korotkov directly about his knowledge of the German attack plans.

Schulze-Boysen employed the following people in his network: his wife, Libertas, who acted as his deputy; Elisabeth and Kurt Schumacher, who were close contacts; Eva-Maria Buch, who worked in the German Institute of Foreign Affairs; Oda Schottmüller and Erika von Brockdorff, who used their houses for radio operations; Kurt Schulze, radio matters; Herbert Engelsing, an informant; Günther Weisenborn, who produced Nazi commissions for Joseph Goebbels, John Graudenz, whose work as a salesman to the Luftwaffe allowed him to visit most airfields. Horst Heillman, a Funkabwehr officer and Elfriede Paul, who acted as a cutout for Engelsing.

Harnack employed the following people in his network: Herbert Gollnow, an Abwehr officer; Wolfgang Havemann, a scientist in German Naval Intelligence Service; Adam and Greta Kuckhoff; German industrialist Leo Skrzypczynski; politician Adolf Grimme; and railway worker John Sieg. Tool designer Karl Behrens and Rose Schlösinger, a secretary at the Federal Foreign Office, were couriers to Hans Coppi.

During May 1941, Korotkov had taken delivery of two shortwave radio sets that had been delivered in the Soviet Union embassy diplomatic pouch, in an attempt to make the Berlin group independent. They were handed to Greta Kuckhoff without precise instructions on how to use them, nor in how to maintain contact with the Soviet leadership in case of war. The two radio sets were of different design. The first set had been damaged by Korotkov and had been returned to the Soviet Union for repair, returned and kept by Greta Kuckhoff on 22 June 1941. That other set was battery-powered, with a range of 600 miles that was passed to Coppi on the instruction of Schulze-Boyson at Kurt and Elisabeth Schumacher's apartment. On 26 June 1941, Coppi sent a message:A thousand greetings to all friends. Moscow replied "We have received and read your test message. The substitution of letters for numbers and vice versa is to be done using the permanent number 38745 and the codeword Schraube", and directing them to transmit at a predefined frequency and time. After that, the batteries were too weak to reach Moscow.

In June 1941, the Soviet Embassy was withdrawn from Berlin, and from that point, Schulze-Boysen's information was couriered to Brussels where it was transmitted using Gurevich's network.

In November 1941, another radio set was passed to Coppi at the Eichkamp S-Bahn railway station. It was supplied by Kurt Schulze, who gave Coppi technical instructions on its use. This set was more powerful, being AC powered. Coppi would later accidentally destroy the AC-powered transmitter by connecting it to a DC power socket, destroying the transformer and vacuum tube. Coppi and the Harnack/Shulze-Boysen resistance groups never received sufficient training from Korotkov. Indeed, when Greta Kuckhoff was trained she concluded that her own technical preparations were "extraordinarily inadequate". Only a few members of the Schulze-Boysen/Harnack Group knew about these radio experiments.

=== Contact with other groups ===
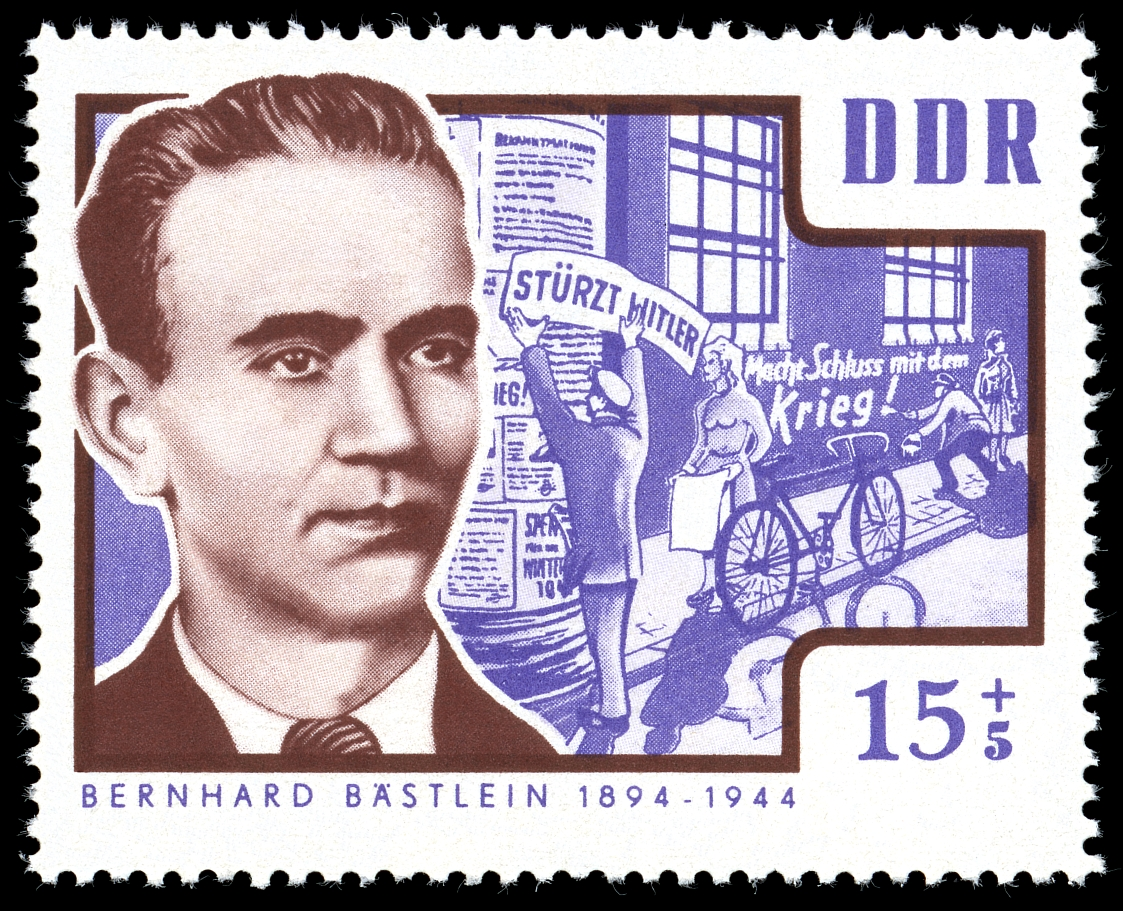
Bernhard Bästlein on a GDR stamp from 1964

Since the beginning of the war in 1939, the Berlin group of friends intensified both exchange and cooperation among themselves. They had a desire to connect with organised and non-organised resistance groups from other regions and sections of the population and to explore common possibilities for action.

Both Harro Schulze-Boysen and Arvid Harnack were good friends with lawyer and academic Carl Dietrich von Trotha. Harnack knew Horst von Einsiedel, also a lawyer, since 1934. Schulze-Boysen knew the diplomat and author, Albrecht Haushofer from the Deutsche Hochschule für Politik, where he was holding seminars. In 1940, Trotha and Einsiedel joined the Kreisau Circle, a resistance group that was officially formed with the merging of the intellectual peers of Jurists Helmuth James von Moltke and Peter Yorck von Wartenburg.

Its members included lawyer, Adam von Trott zu Solz, Albrecht Haushofer, industrialist Ernst Borsig, bureaucrat Fritz-Dietlof von der Schulenburg, philosopher, Alfred Delp, politician Julius Leber, scientist Carlo Mierendorff and many others. Harnack and Schulze-Boysen had a frequent discussion with the group until 1942. The prison chaplain Harald Poelchau who accompanied the members of the resistance groups who were to be executed, was part of the Kreisau Circle resistance group.

Other members of the German group sought contact with the then largely destroyed underground network of the KPD. In 1939, the machinist Hans Coppi established contact with the resistance group associated with theatre actor and former KPD member Wilhelm Schürmann-Horster, while they were both taking evening classes.

In 1934, John Sieg and Robert Uhrig met Wilhelm Guddorf and sinologist Philipp Schaeffer while imprisoned in Luckau prison in Brandenburg, later making contact with KPD officials when released from concentration camp. Guddorf, on the other hand, held talks with the Bästlein-Jacob-Abshagen Group in Hamburg. The lawyer Josef Römer who had contacts with Sieg, Uhrig and Arthur Sodtke also had contact with a Munich resistance group through Bavarian politician Viktoria Hösl.

In November 1942, in a meeting organised by Munich artist, Lilo Ramdohr, White Rose resistance group members Hans Scholl and Alexander Schmorell visited Chemnitz, to meet Falk Harnack, brother to Arvid Harnack. Scholl and Schmorell were looking to contact anti-Nazi resistance groups in Berlin and unite them together as allies with a common aim. Harnack held discussions with his cousins Klaus and Dietrich Bonhoeffer in order to prepare them for a meeting with Hans Scholls. In the spring of 1943, four members of the White Rose met Falk Harnack again in Munich, but received no clear commitment to his cooperation.

=== Reorganisation ===
In July and August 1942, the Soviet Main Directorate of State Security (GRU) tried to re-establish contacts with internal German opponents of Hitler. To this end, German communists in exile who had been trained by the GRU as espionage agents were parachuted into Germany.

On 16 May 1942, Soviet agents Erna Eifler and Wilhelm Fellendorf were parachuted into East Prussia. They were instructed to contact Ilse Stöbe in Berlin. However, they never managed to locate Stöbe and by June 1942 found themselves in Hamburg, a city they knew well. Fellendorf's mother, Katharina Fellendorf, hid the two. Later they moved and were hidden by Herbert Bittcher In early July, they took shelter with Bernhard Bästlein. Eifler's location was leaked by a communist informer to the Gestapo and she was arrested on 15 October 1942. Fellendorf managed to escape arrest for another two weeks.

On 5 August 1942 Albert Hoessler and Robert Barth parachuted into Gomel, reaching Berlin via Warsaw and Posen, a few days before the arrest of Schulze-Boysen. They had been sent to establish a radio link to the GRU for the Schulze-Boysen Group initially from Erika von Brockdorff's apartment and then Oda Schottmüller's apartment. They were caught before they could make preliminary contact with Soviet intelligence.

On 23 October 1942, Heinrich Koenen parachuted into Osterode in East Prussia and made his way to Berlin, to meet his contact Rudolf Herrnstadt. He carried a radio set and a receipt for $6500 that had been signed by Rudolf von Scheliha in 1938. He planned to use it to blackmail von Scheliha, if he had proved recalcitrant in his endeavours. The Gestapo had advanced notice of Koenen's arrival from a radio intercept message that they had decrypted, and he was arrested on 29 October 1942 by a Gestapo official waiting at Stöbe's apartment.

The group around Robert Uhrig and Beppo Römer had more than two hundred members in Berlin and Munich with branches in Leipzig, Hamburg and Mannheim. In February 1942, the group was infiltrated by the Gestapo. By October 1942, the many members of the Bästlein-Jacob-Abshagen Group in Hamburg had been arrested. Several members of these groups including Anton Saefkow, Bernhard Bästlein and Franz Jacob, fled from Hamburg to Berlin and began building a new resistance network of illegal cells in the factories of Berlin, that became known as the Saefkow-Jacob-Bästlein Organization.

== Persecution by Nazi authorities ==
=== Unmasking ===
The events that led up to the exposure of the Red Orchestra were facilitated by a number of blunders by Soviet intelligence, over several months. The radio transmission that exposed them, was intercepted at 3:58 am on 26 June 1941 and was the first of many that were to be intercepted by the Funkabwehr. The message received at the intercept station in Zelenogradsk had the format: Klk from Ptx... Klk from Ptx... Klk from Ptx... 2606. 03. 3032 wds No. 14 qbv. This was followed by thirty-two 5-figure message groups with a morse end of message terminator containing AR 50385 KLK from PTX. (PTX) Until that point, the Nazi counter-intelligence operation did not believe there was a Soviet network operating in Germany and/or the occupied territories. By September 1941, over 250 messages had been intercepted, but it took several months for them to reduce the suspected area of transmission to within the Belgium area using goniometric triangulation. On 30 November 1941, close range direction-finding teams moved into Brussels and almost immediately found three transmitter signals. Abwehr officer Henry Piepe was ordered to take charge of the investigation around October or November 1941.

==== Rue des Atrébates ====
The Abwehr choose a location at 101 Rue des Atrébates, that provided the strongest signal from PTX and on 12 December 1941, at 2 pm, the house was raided by the Abwehr and Geheime Feldpolizei.

Inside the house were courier Rita Arnould, writing specialist Anton Danilov as well as cipher clerk Zofia Poznańska. The radio transmitter was still warm. The woman was trying to burn enciphered messages, which were recovered. The radio operator was Anton Danilov. The Germans found a hidden room holding the material and equipment needed to produce forged documents, including blank passports and inks. Arnould's psychological composure collapsed when she was captured, stating; I'm glad it is all over. While Arnould became an informer, Poznańska committed suicide in prison after being tortured. The next day, Mikhail Makarov turned up at the house and was arrested. Trepper also visited the house, but his documentation in the form of an Organisation Todt pass was so authentic, that he was released. In Berlin, the Gestapo was ordered to assist Harry Piepe and they selected Karl Giering to lead the investigation and the Sonderkommando Rote Kapelle.

Arnould identified two passports belonging to the aliases of Trepper and Gurevich, his deputy in Belgium. From the scraps of paper recovered, Wilhelm Vauck, principal cryptographer of the Funkabwehr was able to discover the code being used for message encipherment was based on a chequerboard cipher with a book key. Arnould, recalled the agents, regularly read the same books and was able to identify the name of one as Le miracle du Professeur Wolmar by Guy de Téramond After scouring most of Europe for the correct edition, a copy was found in Paris on 17 May 1942. The Funkabwehr discovered that, of the three hundred intercepts in their possession, only 97 were enciphered using a phrase from the Téramond book. The Funkabwehr never discovered that some of the remaining messages had been enciphered using La femme de trente ans by Honoré de Balzac.

==== Rue de Namur ====
Following the arrests, the other two transmitters had remained off the air for six months, except for routine transmission. Trepper assumed the investigation had died down and ordered the transmissions to restart. On 30 July 1942, the Funkabwehr identified a house at 12 Rue de Namur, Brussels and arrested GRU radio operator, Johann Wenzel. Two messages waiting to be enciphered were discovered in the house that contained details of such startling content, the plans for Case Blue, that Abwehr officer Henry Piepe immediately drove to Berlin from Brussels to report to German High Command. His actions resulted in the formation of the Sonderkommando Rote Kapelle. Giering ordered Wenzel to be moved to Fort Breendonk where he was tortured and decided to cooperate with the Abwehr, betraying Erna Eifler, Wilhelm Fellendorf, Bernhard Bästlein and the Hübners.

==== Soviet blunder ====
German counter-intelligence spent months assembling the data but finally, Vauck succeeded in decrypting around 200 of the captured messages. On 15 July 1942, Vauck decrypted a message that was dated 10 October 1941. The message was addressed to Kent, (Anatoly Gurevich) and had the lead format:L3 3 DE RTX 1010-1725 WDS GBD FROM DIREKTOR PERSONAL. When the message was decrypted, it gave the location of two addresses in Berlin. The message stated:

Go to see Adam Kuckhoff at 18 Wilhelmstrasse, (Note: This is an error as the Kuckhoffs lived at Wilhelmhöerstrasse 18.) telephone 83-62-61, the second stairwell on the left, top floor and tell them that you have been sent a friend of "Arvid" and "Harro" whom Arvid knows as Alexander Erdberg. Mention the book of Kuckhoff that he gave him before the war and the play "Ulenspiegel". Suggest to Kuckhoff that he arrange a meeting for you, KENT, with "Arvid" and "Harro". If that is impossible, then clarify through Kuckhoff:

A set of instructions were included followed by:

If Kuckhoff cannot be found, contact the wife of "Harro" Libertas Schulze-Boysen, at her address 19 Altenburger Alle... (Note: Both Höhne and Perrault, which rely on Wilhelm F. Flicke Spionagegruppe Rote Kapelle differ from the Moscow telegram discovered by Brysac in the Soviet archives.)

The messages provided the locations of the apartments of the Kuckhoffs and the Schulze-Boysens. Another message that had been sent on 28 August 1941 instructed Gurevich to contact Alte, Ilse Stöbe. The two addresses were passed to the Reich Security Main Office IV 2A, who easily identified the people living there, and from 16 July 1942 were put under surveillance.

A meeting was arranged between Walter Schellenberg, Egbert Bentivegni, Wilhelm Canaris and Hans Kopp to discuss the situation and it was decided the Gestapo would be solely responsible for exposing the group in Berlin. The Sicherheitsdienst appointed Horst Kopkow and Johannes Strübing while Giering and Piepe continued the work in the west.

=== Arrests ===
==== Germany ====
The Abwehr's hand was forced when Horst Heilmann attempted to inform Schulze-Boysen of the situation. The previous day Schule-Boysen had asked Heilmann to check if the Abwehr had got wind of his contacts abroad. Heilmann, a German mathematician, worked at Referat 12 of the Funkabwehr, the radio decryption department in Matthäikirchplatz in Berlin. On 31 August 1942, he discovered the names of his friends in a folder that had been provided to him.

According to one version of events Heilmann immediately phoned Schulze-Boysen, using Wilhelm Vauck's office phone as his phone was in use. As Schulze-Boysen was not in, Heilmann left a message with the maid of the household. When Schulze-Boysen returned, he immediately phoned the number, but unfortunately, it was answered by Vauck.

On 31 August 1942, Harro Schulze-Boysen was arrested in his office in the Ministry of Aviation. On 7 September 1942, the Harnacks had been arrested while on holiday. Schulze-Boysen's wife, Libertas, had received a puzzling phone call from his office several days before. She was also warned by the woman who delivered her mail that the Gestapo was monitoring it. Libertas's assistant radio author, Alexander Spoerl, also noticed that Adam Kuckhoff had gone missing while working in Prague.

Libertas, suspecting her husband had been arrested, contacted the Engelsings. Herbert Engelsing tried to contact Kuckhoff without a result. Libertas and Spoerl both started to panic and frantically tried to warn others. They destroyed the darkroom at the Kulurefilm center and Libertas destroyed her meticulously collected archive. At home, she packed a suitcase of all Harro Schulze-Boysens papers and then tried to fabricate evidence of loyalty to the Nazi State by writing fake letters. She sent the suitcase to Günther Weisenborn in the vain hope that it could be hidden and he tried to contact Harro Schulze-Boysen in vain. As the panic reached the rest of the group, frantic searches ensued as each person tried to clear their homes of any anti-Nazi paraphernalia.

Documents were burnt, one transmitter was dumped in a river, but the arrests had already started. On 8 September, Libertas was arrested. Adam Kuckhoff was arrested on 12 September 1942 while filming and Greta Kuckhoff the same day. The Coppis were arrested the same day along with the Schumachers and the Graudenzs. By 26 September, Günther Weisenborn and his wife had been arrested. By March 1943, between 120 and 139 people had been arrested (sources vary).

Those who were arrested were taken to basement cells (German: Hausgefängnis) in the most dreaded address in all of German-occupied Europe, Gestapo headquarters at 8 Prinze-Albert Strasse and put into custody by the Gestapo. The arrests continued and when the cells became overcrowded, several men were sent to Spandau Prison and the women to Alexanderplatz police station. However the leaders remained. Officers of the Sonderkommando Rote Kapelle conducted the initial interrogation

At first, Harnack, Schulze-Boysen and Kuckhoff refused to say anything, so the interrogators applied intensified interrogations where each was tied between four beds, calf clamps and thumbscrews were applied, then they were whipped.

==== Belgium ====
Piepe interrogated Rita Arnould, about the forger's room at Rue des Atrébates. Giering turned to Rita Arnould as the new lead in the investigation and she identified the Abwehr informer and Jewish forger Abraham Rajchmann. It was Rajchmann who forged identity documents in the secret room of 101 Rue des Atrébates. Rajchmann in turn betrayed Soviet agent Konstantin Jeffremov who was arrested on 22 July 1942 in Brussels, while attempting to obtain forged identity documents for himself. Jeffremov was to be tortured but agreed to cooperate and gave up several important members of the espionage network in Belgium and the Netherlands. In the Netherlands, he exposed former Rote Hilfe member and espionage agent Anton Winterink, who was arrested on 26 July 1942 by Piepe. Winterink was taken to Brussels, where he confessed after two weeks of interrogation by torture. Jeffremov (sources vary) also revealed the Simexco company name to the Abwehr and at the same time exposed the name and the existence of the Trepper espionage network in France. Eventually Jeffremov began to work for the Sonderkommando in a Funkspiel operation. Through Jeffremov, contact was made with Germaine Schneider, a courier, who worked for the group between Brussels and Paris. However, Schneider contacted Leopold Trepper, the technical director of Soviet Red Army Intelligence in western Europe. Trepper advised Schneider to sever all contact with Jeffremov and move to a hideout in Lyons. Giering instead focused on Germaine Schneider's husband Franz Schneider. In November 1942, Franz Schneider was interrogated by Giering but as he was not part of the network he was not arrested and managed to inform Trepper that Jeffremov had been arrested.

Abraham Rajchmann was arrested by Piepe on 2 September 1942 when his usefulness as an informer to the Abwehr was at an end. Rajchmann also decided to cooperate with the Abwehr resulting in his betrayal of his mistress, the Comintern member Malvina Gruber, who was arrested on 12 October 1942. Gruber immediately decided to cooperate with the Abwehr, in an attempt to avoid intensified interrogation, i.e. torture. She admitted the existence of a Soviet agent Anatoly Gurevich and his probable location, as well as exposing several members of the Trepper espionage network in France.

Following a routine investigation, Harry Piepe discovered that the firm Simexco in Brussels was being used as a cover for Soviet espionage operations by the Trepper network. It was used as a means to generate monies that could be used in day-to-day operations by the espionage group unbeknownst to the employees of the company and at the same time provide travel documentation ( (Note: Known as the Ausweis, these were special versions of the Kennkarte, that enabled European wide travel.)) and facilitates for European wide telephone communication between group members. Piepe was concerned about the large number of telegrams the company had sent to Berlin, Prague and Paris and decided to investigate. Piepe visited the Chief Commissariat Officer for Brussels, who was responsible for the company. In the meeting, Piepe showed the two photographs, that had been discovered at the house at 101 Rue des Atrébates, to the officer who identified them as Trepper and Gurevich.

As part of a combined operation with Giering in Paris, Piepe raided the offices of Simexco on 19 November 1942. When the Gestapo entered the Simexco office they found only one person, a clerk, but managed to discover all the names and addresses of Simexco employees and shareholders from company records. Over the month of November, most of the people associated with the company were arrested and taken to Saint-Gilles Prison in Brussels or Fort Breendonk in Mechelen. The Nazi German tradition of Sippenhaft meant that many family members of the accused were also arrested, interrogated and executed.

==== Netherlands ====
On 18 August 1942, Winterink was arrested by the Sonderkommando Rote Kapelle. Goulooze was arrested on 15 November 1943 and was sent to Sachsenhausen concentration camp. He managed to survive the experience by assuming an alias. In 1948, he was expelled from the Communist Party of the Netherlands.

==== France ====
The Abwehr in Brussels and the Sonderkommando Rote Kapelle believed they had full control of the Red Orchestra in Belgium and the Netherlands well before the end of 1942. There is no clear indication when Giering, Piepe and the Sonderkommando moved to Paris, although various sources indicate it was October 1942. Perrault reports it was later summer rather than early autumn. When the unit moved, it relocated to 11 Rue des Saussaies. Before leaving, Piepe and Giering agreed that Rajchmann would be the best person to take to Paris and find Trepper. When they arrived in Paris, Giering sent Rajchmann out to visit all the dead letterboxes that he knew about while leaving a message to Trepper to contact him. However Trepper never showed up. Giering then tried to establish a meeting with a contact, using information from the correspondence between Simexco and an employee of the Paris office of the Belgian Chamber of Commerce. That ultimately proved unsuccessful, so Giering turned back to investigating Simexco. Giering visited the Seine District Commercial Court where he discovered that Léon Grossvogel was a shareholder of Simex. He had been informed by Jeffremov that Grossvogel was one of Trepper's assistants. Giering and Piepe decided to approach Organisation Todt to determine whether they could provide a way to identify where Trepper was located. Giering obtained a signed certificate of cooperation from Otto von Stülpnagel, the military commander of occupied France, and visited the Todt offices. Giering, together with organisation commander, created a simple ruse to trap Trepper. However, the ruse failed. Giering decided to start arresting employees of Simex and they were imprisoned in Fresnes Prison. On 19 November 1942, Suzanne Cointe, a secretary at Simex and Alfred Corbin, the commercial director of the firm were arrested.

Corbin was interrogated but failed to disclose the location of Monsieur Gilbert, the alias that Trepper was using in his dealings with Simex, so Giering sent for a torture expert. However, Corbin's wife told the Abwehr that Corbin had given Trepper the name of a dentist. After being tortured, Corbin informed Giering of the address of Trepper's dentist. Trepper was subsequently arrested on 24 November by Piepe and Giering, while he was sitting in a dentist's chair. It was the result of two years of searching. On 24 November, Giering contacted Hitler to inform him of the capture of Trepper.

Both Trepper and Gurevich, who had been arrested on 9 November 1942 in Marseille were brought to Paris and were treated well by Giering. Trepper informed Giering that his family and relatives in the USSR would be killed if it became known to Soviet intelligence that he was captured. Giering agreed that should Trepper collaborate, his arrest would remain a secret. Over the next few weeks, Trepper betrayed the names of agents to Giering including Léon Grossvogel, Hillel Katz and several other Soviet agents. According to Piepe, when Trepper talked, it was not out of fear of torture or defeat, but out of duty. While he gave up the names and addresses of most of the members of his own network, he was sacrificing his associates to protect the various members of the French Communist Party, whom he had an absolute belief in. Unlike Trepper, Gurevich refused to name any agents he had recruited.

=== Funkspiel ===
When the Sonderkommando Rote Kapelle captured Soviet radio operators, instead of immediately executing them after interrogation as was normal practice for other agents, they were instead forced into running separate Funkspiel operations, under the direction of Giering. The term Funkspiel, defined by the German name "Funk" meaning radio and "spiel" meaning play or performance, was a common counterintelligence technique where controlled information was transmitted over a captured agent's radio, where the agent's parent service had no knowledge that the agent had turned. It was undertaken for a number of reasons that included poisoning the source by conveying deceptive material, discovering important intelligence and identifying networks.

To facilitate the operation, Hitler had given permission to pass on messages in coordination with the Reich Foreign Minister Joachim von Ribbentrop and the Oberkommando der Wehrmacht, even if it fulfilled the definition of treason. The Gestapo's purpose in running this particular funkspiel was to discover Soviet links to the French Communist Party, the French Resistance and the Red Three.

Two transmission stations were built on the outskirts of Paris that were operated by the German Schutzpolizei for use by the agents captured in France. In Brussels, a house on Rue de l'Aurore was used for Funkspiel operations. From August 1942 to October 1942, the RSHA ran four Funkspiel operations in Brussels, for agents captured in Belgium. The Sonderkommando in France ran the funkspiel from 25 December 1942 to August 1944. Gurevich continued his own funkspiel in various locations until May 1945. Six radio sets that had been captured out of eight were used.

Johann Wenzel ran a radio station called Weide that started in August. Anton Winterink, ran a station known Beam Tanne that began in September. In October, two stations were established, one for Jeffremov that was known as station Buche-Pascal and one for Hermann Isbutzki known as Buche-Bob. Trepper's was known as Eiffel began on 25 December 1942, in Paris and Gurevich's funkspiel known as Mars began in March 1943.

The German funkspiel operation was largely a failure. In Belgium, Soviet intelligence was likely given an early warning when Germaine Schneider informed Trepper of the raid at 12 Rue de Namur in July 1942. In Paris, the Germans made a series of fundamental mistakes in procedures during the operation. The principle mistake they made was not recognising the difficulties faced by Trepper in establishing and maintaining communications in the first place. They made no attempt to model the types of communication difficulties the group would have faced. They also made series of sloppy mistakes in operational procedures, e.g. sending multi-part message out of order, nor taking cognisance of the supposed location of individuals and repeatedly sending the same message on different days. The Sonderkommando were also unable to overcome the problem of passing false information to Soviet Intelligence. While Trepper's Eiffel operation was running, the Germans passed general statements that had no detailed military information. This was another failure as Trepper had made a career out of delivering high-quality intelligence. Soviet Intelligence became increasingly strident in their demands for precise and accurate details. However, on 5 June 1943, the Commander-in-Chief West Gerd von Rundstedt refused to answer any further questions sent by Soviet Intelligence.

In August 1943, Heinz Pannwitz became director of the Sonderkommando Rote Kapelle in Belgium and France, replacing Giering. Panwitz reduced the size of the Sonderkommando and changed the type of messages sent; reducing the military aspect and instead focused on reports from the Catholic church, the German economy, Russian emigration and other civilian areas. The messages that Pannwitz sent in coordination with Heinrich Müller were designed to deepen mistrust between the Soviet Union and the western allies. The funkspiel operations continued until 3 May 1945.

=== Judgement ===
==== Germany ====
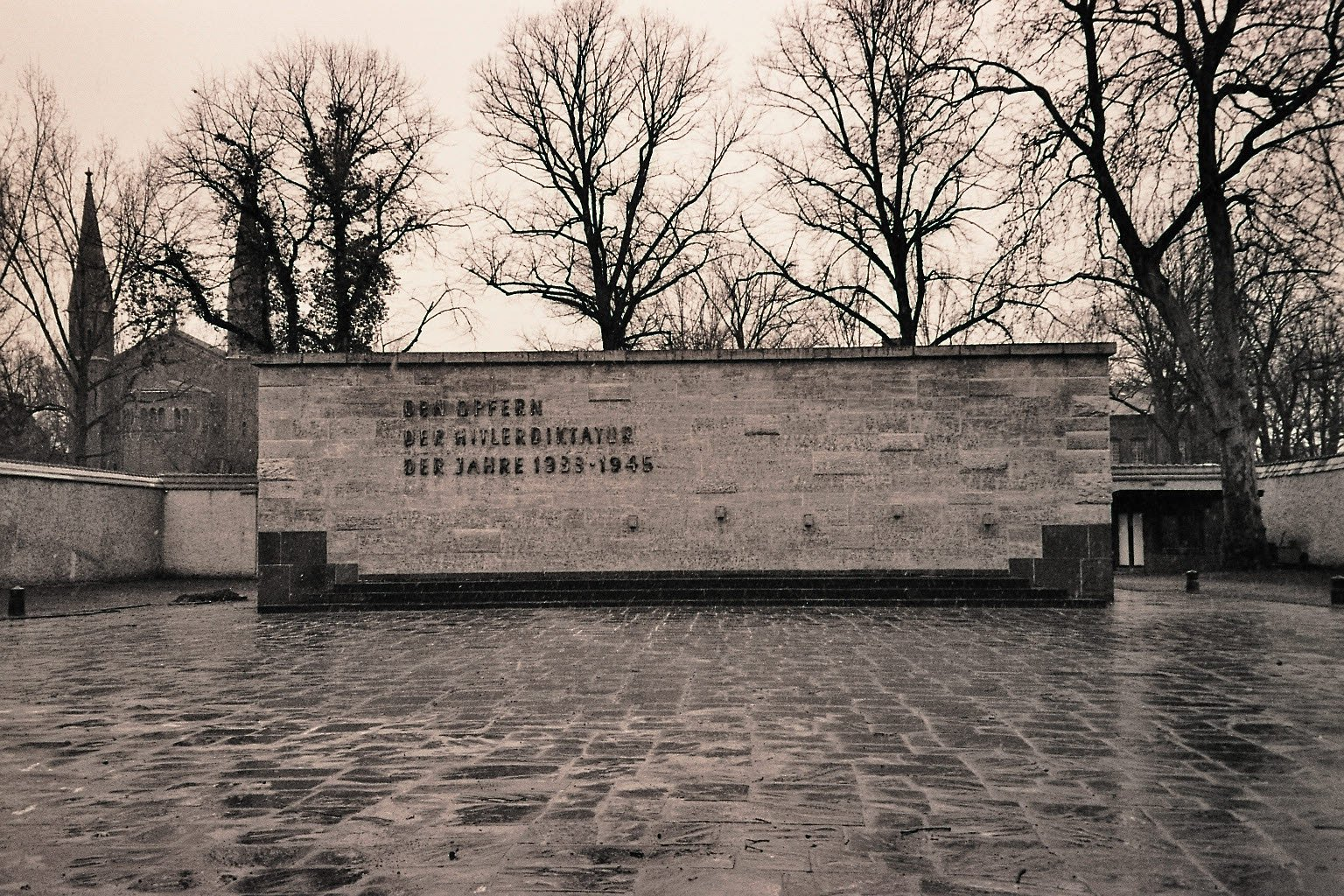
The exterior of the Plötzensee Memorial in Berlin

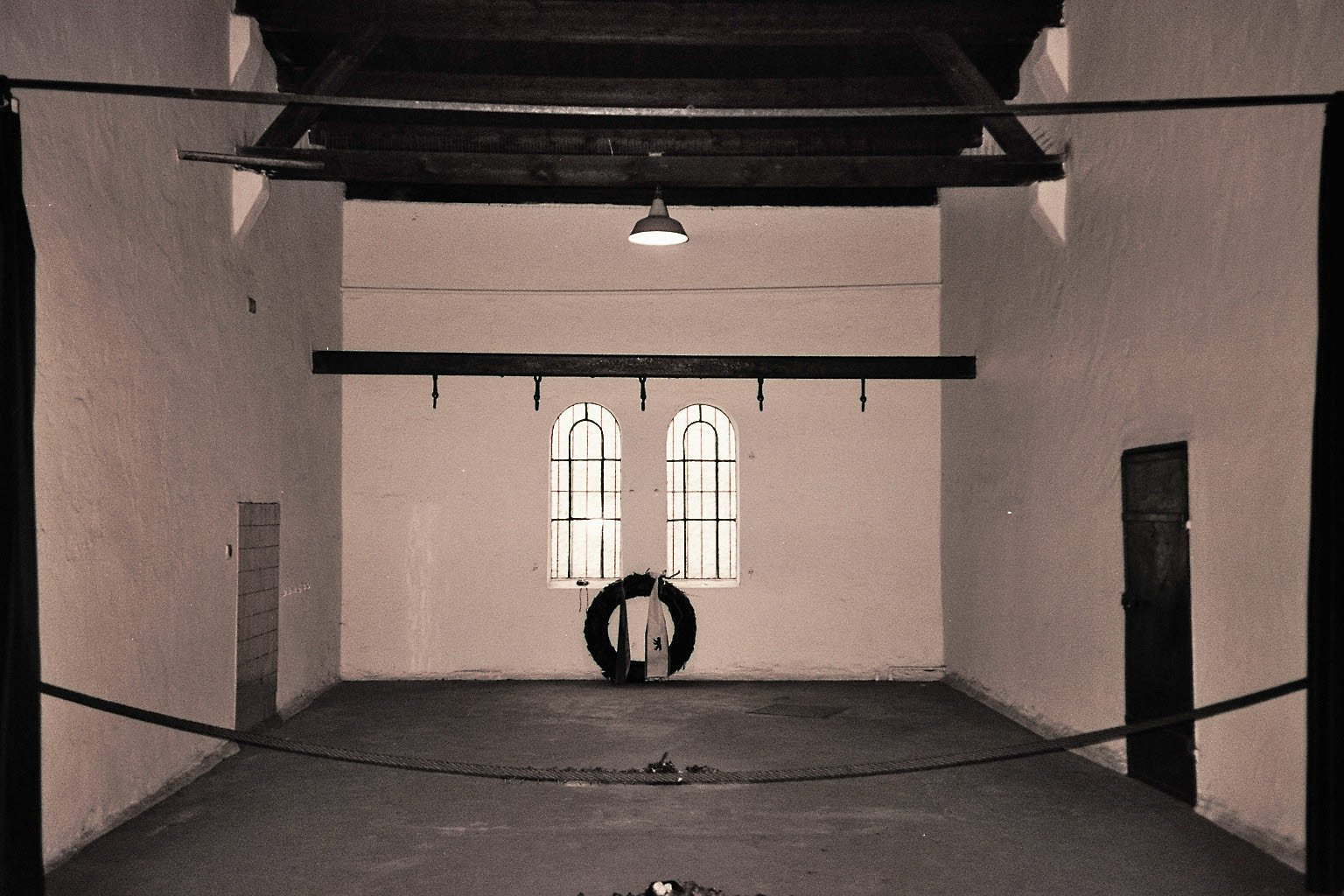
The interior of the Plötzensee Memorial in Berlin

On 25 September 1942, Reich Marshal Hermann Göring, Reichsführer Heinrich Himmler and Gestapo Chief Inspector Heinrich Müller met to discuss the case. They decided the whole network should be charged with espionage and treason together as a group. In the second half of October, Müller proposed that the trial take place at Volksgerichtshof where most sedition cases were directed. Its new president in August 1942 was Roland Freisler who almost always sided with the prosecuting authority, to the point that being brought before him was tantamount to a capital charge.

Himmler who was a proponent of the proposal reported it to Hitler. However, the Führer, aware of the military nature of many people in the group, ordered Göring to burn out the cancer. Göring brought Schulze-Boysen into the air ministry, so needed to choose the correct prosecutor. On 17 October 1942, Göring met with Judge Advocate Manfred Roeder aboard his special train in the town of Vinnytsia. Göring trusted Roeder to prosecute the case correctly, as he was unlikely to sympathise with any humanitarian motives that would be offered by the defendants. It was only because Roeder was designated as prosecuting counsel that Hitler approved Göring's plan and agreed to hold the trial in the Reichskriegsgericht (RKG, Reich Imperial Court) in Berlin, the highest German military court, instead of the Volksgerichtshof. whose judgements he considered insufficiently harsh. Roeder was seconded to the Reich War Prosecutor's Office especially for the proceedings and commissioned Roeder to take on the indictment of the resistance group before the Reich Imperial Court. Roeder had not been a member of the Reich Military Court prior to that point, and his involvement was an expression of the trust that Göring placed in him. Roeder was universally disliked. Rudolf Behse, counsel for the defendants stated that cynicism and brutality were at the core of his character, stating that his limitless ambition was matched only by his innate sadism. Even his colleagues found him harsh and inconsiderable. Prosecuting judge Eugen Schmitt stated that there was something lacking in his temperament; he did not possess the normal man's sympathy for the suffering of others.... When Axel von Harnack visited Roeder on behalf of the Harnacks, he stated of Roeder, Never since have I experienced an impression of brutality as I did from this man. He was a creature surrounded by an aura of fear.

At the beginning of November 1942, the Gestapo investigation delivered 30 volumes of reports to the Reich War Prosecutor's Office for processing by Roeder. Roeder studied the files but found them inadequate, so decided to conduct further short interrogations. By the end of November 1942, a 90-page report was written by Horst Kopkow known as the Bolshevist Hoch Landesverrats that summarised the activities of the group and it was passed to senior members of the Nazi state for review With the production of the report, the Gestapo considered the initial phase of the investigation successful. At the same time, Roeder completed an 800-page indictment and proceeded to prosecute the group. Roeder determined that 76 people would stand trial of the original group. The indictments were broken down in groups.

On 15 December 1942, the trial began in secret, in the 2nd senate of the Reichskriegsgericht. The presiding judge was Senate President Alexander Kraell. The other judges were professional judge Eugen Schmitt, Viceadmiral Theodor Arps, General Walter Musshoff, and Generalmajor Hermann Stutzer that made up the judicial panel that decided the legal case for each defendant.

The trial was a legal travesty. Prisoners were never able to read their indictments and often they would only meet their lawyers minutes before the case started, in trials that often only lasted hours, with the verdict pronounced on the same day. There was no jury, no peers, no German civilians present in the court, only Gestapo spectators. Attempts were made by family members to find suitable lawyers. Falk Harnack's cousin, Klaus Bonhoeffer, was asked to represent the Harnacks but had refused. In the end, only four lawyers were found to represent the 79 defendants, in over 20 trials. At the centre of the "evidence" prepared by uncontrolled Gestapo interrogations was espionage and subversive activity, which was considered high treason and treason and was punishable by the death penalty. Roeder used the process not only to establish the crimes but also to comprehensively portray the private relationships of the accused in order to show them off as thoroughly depraved immoral people, humiliate them and break them.

==== Belgium, France and Low Countries ====
On 8 March 1943, Manfred Roeder court-martialed each of the Red Orchestra prisoners in a small office at the former Coty Perfume Company, in central Paris. The prisoners were tried under the aegis of the Nacht und Nebel decree. The court-martial process was defined by the courts-martial accelerated procedure of the GOC Third Air Force Region book. The central tenet of the procedures was swiftness. Each prisoner was quickly assigned a lawyer, who asked each of them if they understood the seriousness of the charge against them. The charges would then be read out and the prisoner quickly sentenced. Once the court martial was over, lasting mere minutes, the prisoner was taken back to Fresnes Prison. Prisoners who had insulted Roeder, or for example, given the Communist salute were immediately shot. On 15 April 1943, the remaining prisoners in Fresnes Prison were taken by rail, first stopping in Brussels to pick up the Belgian-based Red Orchestra people that were imprisoned in Breendonk and Saint-Gilles'. The train then proceeded to Berlin where it arrived on 17 April 1943 and the prisoners were distributed depending on sentence. The women including Suzanne Cointe were taken to Moabit Prison and the men taken to Lehrstrasse prison. The Belgian group were initially taken to Gestapo headquarters and then transported to Mauthausen concentration camp.

=== Execution ===
==== Germany ====
In Germany hanging had been outlawed since the 17th century. In March 1933, the Lex van der Lubbe Act was enacted that permitted hanging in public as a particularly dishonourable form of execution. Up until that point, German death sentences were carried out by firing squad in the military courts and by beheading by the guillotine in civil courts. It was seen as nefarious by the Nazis and at the same time, elicited a feeling of shame by the victims. On 12 December 1942, an order was explicitly sent by Otto Georg Thierack to Plötzensee Prison specifying gallows to hang eight people simultaneously. The notice was sent a full three days before the trial. Hitler wanted to further punish the group and indicated the verdict was already fixed.

In his 1963 book, Die Ordnung der Bedrängten : Autobiographisches und Zeitgeschichtliches seit den zwanziger Jahren, the prison chaplain Harald Poelchau stated:

When the day of execution was determined, the person convicted for a day or several days was placed in a special cell: a death cell. In the prisons of Plötzensee and Brandenburg, there were cells downstairs that had been turned into death cells. The very fact of being transferred to this cell let the convict know even before the official notification that his hour had come.

The guillotine was kept in a special room, the execution block that was located in the middle of the prison complex. The brick room, measuring about eight by ten metres, had a cement floor. The room had a single door, that led to the morgue, containing many empty wooden coffins. The room was divided into two parts, separated by a black curtain that could be opened and closed. In the front part of the room, sat the Judge's table.

Thirty minutes before the execution, the prisoner was handcuffed, then stripped to the waist. Women prisoners had their head shaven. They were then led to the room where verdict was immediately read by the prosecutor, who then ordered the executioner: Executioner, proceed with your duties. The curtain was then pulled back to reveal the guillotine. When the execution was completed, the executioner, would call out: Mr. High Prosecutor, the sentence has been carried out!. Guests were invited to attend the execution and it was considered an honour.

The first eleven death sentences for "high and state treason" and two sentences for "passive aiding and abetting in high treason" of six and ten years in prison were issued on 19 December and were presented to Hitler on 21 December. He rejected all requests for pardon and revoked the two penal sentences and referred these cases to the 3rd Senate of the RKG to reopen the case. In the eleven death sentences, the method and schedule of the executions were determined. On 22 December, from 7:00 p.m. to 7:20 pm, the following were hanged every four minutes:

- Rudolf von Scheliha
- Harro Schulze-Boysen
- Arvid Harnack
- Kurt Schumacher
- John Graudenz

From 20:18 to 20:33 o'clock, every three minutes the following were beheaded:

- Horst Heilmann
- Hans Coppi
- Kurt Schulze
- Ilse Stöbe
- Libertas Schulze-Boysen
- Elisabeth Schumacher

Roeder was present at the executions as chief prosecutor.

On 16 January 1943, the 3rd Senate also sentenced Mildred Harnack and Erika von Brockdorff to death on the basis of new incriminating evidence from the Gestapo claiming that the women had knowledge of the radio messages. From 14 to 18 January 1943, the 2nd Senate heard the cases of nine other defendants who had been involved in the adhesive sticking operation. They were all sentenced to death for "favouring the enemy" and "war treason". From 1 to 3 February, six other defendants were tried: Adam and Greta Kuckhoff, Adolf and Maria Grimme, Wilhelm Guddorf and Eva-Maria Buch. Only the death sentence for Adolf Grimme requested by Roeder was reduced to three years imprisonment: Grimme was able to make it credible that he had only seen the Agis leaflet briefly once. His wife was released without condition.

On 13 May, thirteen further members of the group were executed at Plötzensee: Karl Behrens, Erika Gräfin von Brockdorff, Wilhelm Guddorf, Helmut Himpel, Walter Husemann, Walter Küchenmeister, Friedrich Rehmer, John Rittmeister, Philipp Schaeffer, Heinz Strelow, Fritz Thiel, Erhard Thomfor and Richard Weissensteiner.

Himpel's fiancé Maria Terwiel who had helped copy and distribute the Agis leaflet, and had written handbills and put up posters against the Nazi propaganda "Soviet Paradise" exhibition, was guillotined at Plötzensee on 5 August. Able in Spandau to coordinate his testimony with Himpel and Graudenz, her collaborator, the pianist Helmut Roloff, was released on 26 January 1943.

Of the remaining prisoners, 50 were sentenced to prison. Four men among the accused committed suicide in prison, five were murdered without trial. Some 65 death sentences were carried out.

==== Belgium, France and Low Countries ====
When a particular funkspiel operation was completed, the radio operator was usually executed by the Gestapo. Several members managed to escape custody however, including Wenzel on 17 November 1942, who escaped through an unlocked door and Trepper on 13 September 1943, while visiting a pharmacy. Trepper returned to the Soviet Union in January 1945 and due to his being recruited by General Yan Karlovich Berzin, who had fallen out of favour, he was immediately arrested and held for ten years in Lubyanka, After his release, Trepper wrote an extensive report on his actions during the war. In it, he declared:

The actual responsibility for the liquidation of the Berlin group rests with the management of the military intelligence agency in Moscow and the Central Committee of the illegal Communist Party of Germany.

Wenzel returned in January 1945 and was also imprisoned, due his involvement in the funkspiel. Gurevich was the last to complete his funkspiel on 3 May 1945, when he was captured with Pannwitz. When Gurevich returned to the Soviet Union in June 1945, he was interrogated and sentenced to 20 years for treason.

Of the 68 rank and file members of the Red Orchestra who were transported from Belgium and France by train, only 9 survived the war. Many members of the group never made it to trial and it is not known what happened to them. They have effectively disappeared without trace. The death of French resistance fighter Suzanne Spaak is perhaps illustrative, as she was shot in her cell, in the last days of the war by Pannwitz. The recruiter Hillel Katz disappeared after being tortured and then tried by Roeder. The worst torture given by the Gestapo was from dogs. The Simex company manager, Nazarin Drailly, and radio operator Mikhail Makarov had both their legs shredded by dogs. Denied medical help, they would have died quickly.

== Operational procedures ==
Considering the significant number of books and articles that have been written about the Red Orchestra, very little is known about its internal functions.

- Finances:

The British born Soviet agent Alexander Foote was the group's treasurer and paid the entire network. Foote carefully prepared a yearly budget and the following years monies were paid out in one or two lump sums, sent by a courier. Ten-thousand dollars was the common sum that was paid to agents on first entering a country. The Soviets were considered by American intelligence to be generous in their payments to agents. Some parts of the network were self-sufficient, for example, the cover companies, Simex and Simexco.

- Motivation:

As a group, Soviet agents were ardent communists, who were highly motivated, considering the constant risk of death. Comintern agents like Henry Robinson tended to be motivated by an ideology driven by the workers struggle for the overthrow of the international bourgeoisie, while professional agents like Trepper, Jeffremov and Makarov were loyal to Stalin and their country. Rank and file members tended to be the most ideologically driven, that often clouded their thinking to some extent.
Many writers who have examined the Red Orchestra have wrestled with the question of whether they could be considered traitors to their country or heroes. In the German legal sphere, it is the Landesverrat (aiding the enemy to defeat the government) versus Hochverrat (the overthrow of a government) argument and the implications for the moral judgment of resistance members who operated under the Nazis. Brysac makes the argument, amongst others regarding the double standard that exists between different resistance members. The conspirators from the 20 July plot are considered genuine resistors, who attain the high moral ground of Hochverrat while Schulze-Boysen and the Harnack's members, for example are considered to be espionage agents and their group used to illustrate the dangerous propinquity of resistance, thereby classed firmly within Landesverrat. There was a clear moral distinction between those who wished to restore a real German government and those who wanted to exploit anti-fascists for the Soviet Union.
Many members of the group were Jewish and working in the group gave them a direct route to strike back at the Nazis. Many of them had lost family members, giving them an additional impetus to act. Most were never motivated by money. Family ties, romance and sex were often a factor in whether an individual could be recruited or used to provide intelligence.

- Documentation:

The group used various methods to get identity documents that were accurate as possible. Common names from the country of origin were used on passports. For identity documents, individuals who had access to genuine blank documents and stamps were cultivated and recruited, for example Abraham Rajchmann. Agents were never to be photographed nor give examples of their handwriting.

- Contact and meetings

Meetings were generally held on a Sunday or during holidays as the police were generally considered less alert. Agents who were to meet each other would involve one agent arriving at the rendezvous site and the other agent would walk by, without interacting with them. A second meeting would then be arranged where the two agents could recognise each other. Post offices, churches, museums and racecourses were considered good places to meet. Railway stations were always avoided. There was no need for a conversation during the meeting. If a principal agent needed to meet his recruits, then it was done as far away as possible from where the principal agent lived. Advanced signals were used by placing a mark in a telephone book in a kiosk. If it was missing, the meeting was cancelled. Telephones were never used to arrange a meeting, but could be used to give warning. Trepper phoned Spaak in Paris in 1943, with a conversation that opened with Bonjour, monsieur indicating the police were there. If the opening line was Bonjour, monsieur, Spaak it would indicate they were safe. This enabled Spaak to escape. For emergency meetings, or where agents lost touch with their network, they were told to visit a particular location, in a nearby foreign country, on certain days and times, with a password and safety signals.

- Communication

The Red Orchestra used official Soviet agencies to forward their intelligence reports until Germany declared war on the Soviet Union on 22 June 1941. Reports were generally mailed or couriered to a particular Soviet organisation and then forwarded to the Soviet Union in a Diplomatic bag. Trepper, for example, used the Soviet Chamber of Commerce in Belgium, later the Military Attaché office in Paris. Rudolf Von Scheliha's information was forwarded through the Soviet Embassy in Poland. Schulze-Boysen and Harnack used through the Soviet Embassy in Germany. When the Soviets withdrew, wireless telegraphy units were used by the group, but these had problems, amongst them reliability and having to find a secure site to transmit. They also gave the Funkabwehr a target. As the radio transmitter throughput was limited, only the core essentials of any report could be transmitted. Radio transmissions usually occurred late at night. Foote, for example, would contact Moscow at 0100, and if conditions were satisfactory and the message short, he finished transmitting in two hours. If it was a long report and atmospheric conditions were bad, he would still be transmitting at 0600 in the morning. Messages were always encrypted by cipher. Occasionally intelligence was sent through the post. Occasionally some reports were sent in the microfilm format and given to couriers to deliver. After 1941, all Soviet agents who were sent into action had training in microphotography. Couriers were heavily used by the group and while slower, couriering was the most secure. To meet a courier coming from Moscow, a rendezvous would be arranged in a foreign country where they would be met. The material being delivered would be camouflaged as a normal product that would be used daily, e.g. cigarette packet, fountain pen or match box. Married couples were considered ideal for working as couriers or cutouts.

== Reception after the war ==
=== German contemporary witnesses ===
In the first post-war years, the performance and role model of the Schulze-Boysen/Harnack group were unreservedly recognised as an important part of the German resistance against the Nazis. In his book Offiziere gegen Hitler (Officers against Hitler) (1946) on the assassination attempt of 20 July 1944 plot, resistance fighter and later writer Fabian von Schlabrendorff paid tribute to the Germans executed as members of the Red Orchestra.

In 1946, the German historian and author, Ricarda Huch publicly called for contributions to her planned collection of biographies of executed resistance fighters Für die Märtyrer der Freiheit (For the Martyrs of Freedom).

Huch explained the task as

How we need the air to breathe, light to see, so we need noble people to live... When we commemorate those who lost their lives in the struggle against National Socialism, we fulfill a duty of gratitude, but at the same time we do ourselves good, because by commemorating them we rise above our Bad luck.

She named the men and women of the Red Orchestra at the forefront. Günther Weisenborn published Der lautlose Aufstand (The Silent Uprising) in 1953, based on material collected from Ricarda Huch, upon her death.

=== Western Intelligence ===
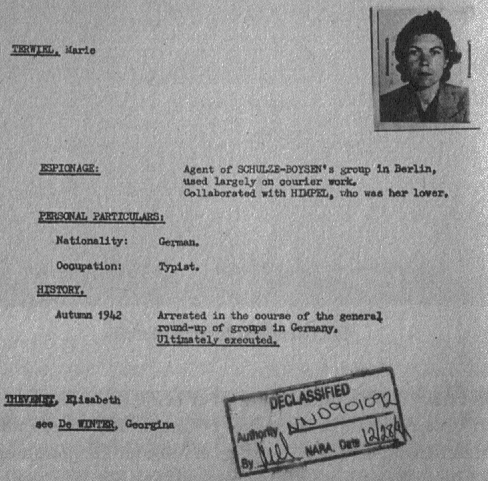
The 1949 CIC file concerning Maria Terwiel.

Western intelligence agencies were interested in the Red Orchestra after the war, as they hoped for information about the workings of Soviet foreign espionage.

In June 1945, British and American intelligence agencies submitted the first report on the Red Orchestra, the Sonderkommando Rote Kapelle and the funkspiel operation run by Heinz Pannwitz. Allied intelligence agencies questioned a large number of people and came to the conclusion that remnants of the Red Orchestra could still exist. The defector Igor Gouzenko warned them that Soviet agents still existed that were sleepers before being activated. At the same time, MI5 came to the conclusion that the Trepper organisation was working against the west.

The British also interrogated Nazi informers, e.g. Horst Kopkow who was head of the special commission Sonderkommando Rote Kapelle. In August 1945, Hilde Purwin told the American Counterintelligence Corps (CIC) about a secret Berlin spy ring for the Soviet Union, about which the judge advocate Egon Koepsch and general judge Manfred Roeder could willingly give information about its dismantling. These were then put out for investigation.

For the British, the most important intelligence were papers captured by the Gestapo, known as the Robinson papers that were created by Henry Robinson, a German comintern agent in Paris with close links to Leopold Trepper. The papers indicated that Robinson had been liaising with Soviet agents in Great Britain. Evelyn McBarnet, an agent of MI5 had worked on the papers to try and identify the names, but they were either aliases, post-boxes, or locations that had been bombed. Another officer of MI5, Michael Hanley also worked on the papers in the 1950s. He identified more than 5000 names belonging to the Red Orchestra organisation.

On 23 December 1947, Manfred Roeder along with Walter Huppenkothen had become informants for the CIC, placing them out of reach of a prosecution brought by Adolf Grimme and Greta Kuckoff. In 1942, senior Gestapo officer Huppenkothen was in charge of department IVa for counter-espionage. On 31 December 1947, the CIC wrote a report in which Roeder had the code name "Othello" that summarised Roeders testimony. Roeder had testified that the "Red Orchestra continued to be alive and active" and that "despite certain interests and attempts to portray it as a resistance organisation, it was in fact a spy network controlled by the Soviets". In his first report, Roeder testified that the Red Orchestra was still active and controlled by the Soviets. Written in early 1947, the 37-page report written for the Americans, identified all members of the Red Orchestra and their functions. He, Roeder, could not avert the death sentences, because Hitler's "Peoples Pest Ordinance" left him no choice at the time. The "civil justice system" had carried out the sentences and carried out a "reconstruction" of the execution site. Hanging was more humane than the fall-by-case. Hitler alone was responsible for rejecting the requests for clemency. He had demanded a summary condemnation of all the imprisoned members against which the Reichskriegsgericht had successfully passed on a case-by-case examination. Huppenkothen also pointed to Gestapo's experience with communist espionage and added a list of Gestapo "experts." On 19 January 1948, Roeder released another report at 90 pages, with photographs of Red Orchestra members, under the name "Bolshevik High and Treasonous Organisation in the Reich and Western Europe" describing it as a spy network spread across Europe that the Soviet Union had built up since the 1930s to conquer the continent. The report used the type of language and mentality characteristic of Roeder and other Nazi judges. As Roeder pointed out that the trial records of the prosecutions had been burned, he felt capable of distorting the historical truth. As the CIC had told Roeder that his reports would only be accepted if he wasn't convicted, the reports became the method by which he defended himself and this led to him distorting many historical facts and defaming the victims of the Nazi dictatorship.

By 1948, although the evidence obtained from the CIC was dubious, the Central Intelligence Agency were convinced that Red Three in Switzerland was still active. Roeder's description of the group indicated how little the Nazi state knew about the Swiss group. As a result, the Allied services took on the Gestapo myth from their informants. However, by 13 May 1948, a CIA memo was in circulation that detailed how Roeder had delivered no concrete evidence. In the summer of 1948, the American military government handed over the investigation against Roeder to the German authorities. Because Roeder was in US custody in Nuremberg at the time, his case was transferred to the German prosecution in Nuremberg.

==== Cold War complicity ====
At the beginning of the Cold War there was complicity between the Nazi lawyers such as Roeder and the US occupying power. As they relied only on statements by Nazi officials for their research into communist and Soviet espionage for their research, before and after 1945, the CIC in many cases shared an anti-communist and sometimes an anti-Semitic attitude with the Nazis. Brysac clearly stated the position:

"in 1949, the year the state was founded in both parts of post-war Germany (and also in the year in which Roeder was released), it was already clear that in the Federal Republic those Germans were preferred who could prove that they hated the communists more than they hated the National Socialists".

This resulted in the continued perscution of the resistance fighters by the post-war German judiciary. In a sense they were convicted twice for their opposition to the Nazi state.

After the war, the former Gestapo officer Johannes Strübing not only admitted to interrogating and torturing Schulze-Boysen, he parlayed his role in the destruction of the Red Orchestra into a successful career in West Germany's intelligence services.

=== Federal German Justice ===
On 15 September 1945, Adolf Grimme filed a complaint against Manfred Roeder with the military government of the British Occupation Zone in Hanover. Along with Greta Kuckhoff and Günther Weisenborn, Grimme also reported Roeder to the International Military Tribunal for crimes against humanity. By January 1947, the Nuremberg prosecutors were convinced he should be tried for war crimes, but after examining the complaint, no charges were brought.

On 7 January 1949 Roeder was released and returned to his family in Neetze. In October 1948, the Nuremberg prosecutors turned the case over to the German courts and the Lüneburg public prosecutor was tasked with pursuing the prosecution. Nuremberg prosecutor, Hans Meuschel hoped that due to Control Council Act No. 10 law, the German law that recognised crimes against humanity, that justice would prevail against Roeder in the court of the Lower Saxony Ministry of Justice. Lüneburg prosecutor Hans-Jürgen Finck investigated Roeder, producing a 1732-page report in 1951, half of it recording in detail the supposed crimes of the Red Orchestra. Finck stated in the report that It cannot be refuted that the death sentences were lawful. Roeder was seen by Finck as a victim, not a perpetrator. On 1 November 1951, Finck closed the case. The Lower Saxony Ministry of Justice kept its final report under wraps for years, as it obviously coincided with Roeder's assessment of the "Red Orchestra".

This interpretation prevailed in the minds of the West German public of the 1950s and was also represented by leading West German historians at the time. Since then, the Red Orchestra in the Federal Republic of Germany has been largely portrayed as a purely secret service organisation. Helmut Kohl wrote in a letter to Harro's brother Hartmut Schulze-Boysen in 1987 that the German resistance consisted of the group around Claus Schenk Graf von Stauffenberg and the White Rose, that the Red Orchestra did not belong to it.

=== Soviet Union ===
The Soviet Union kept quiet about the Berlin group of friends for twenty years. On 6 October 1969, the Supreme Soviet of the USSR posthumously awarded the Order of the Red Banner to Harro Schulze-Boysen, Arvid Harnack, Adam Kuckhoff, Ilse Stöbe and Hansheinrich Kummerow. Günther Weisenborn, Karl Behrens and Albert Hoessler received the Order of the Patriotic War 1st Class.

Articles in Pravda and Izvestia praised the resistance of those so honoured, but interpreted it only as confirmation of the unifying force of the communist Popular Front policy under the dominance of the KPD, which was the only organised anti-fascist resistance group that had specifically collected information for the Soviet Union. Only publicly available Western sources were used in the articles. The Soviet intelligence files remained under lock and key.

In 1974, Juri Korolkov published Die innere Front Roman über d. Rote Kapelle that was about the group.

=== East Germany ===
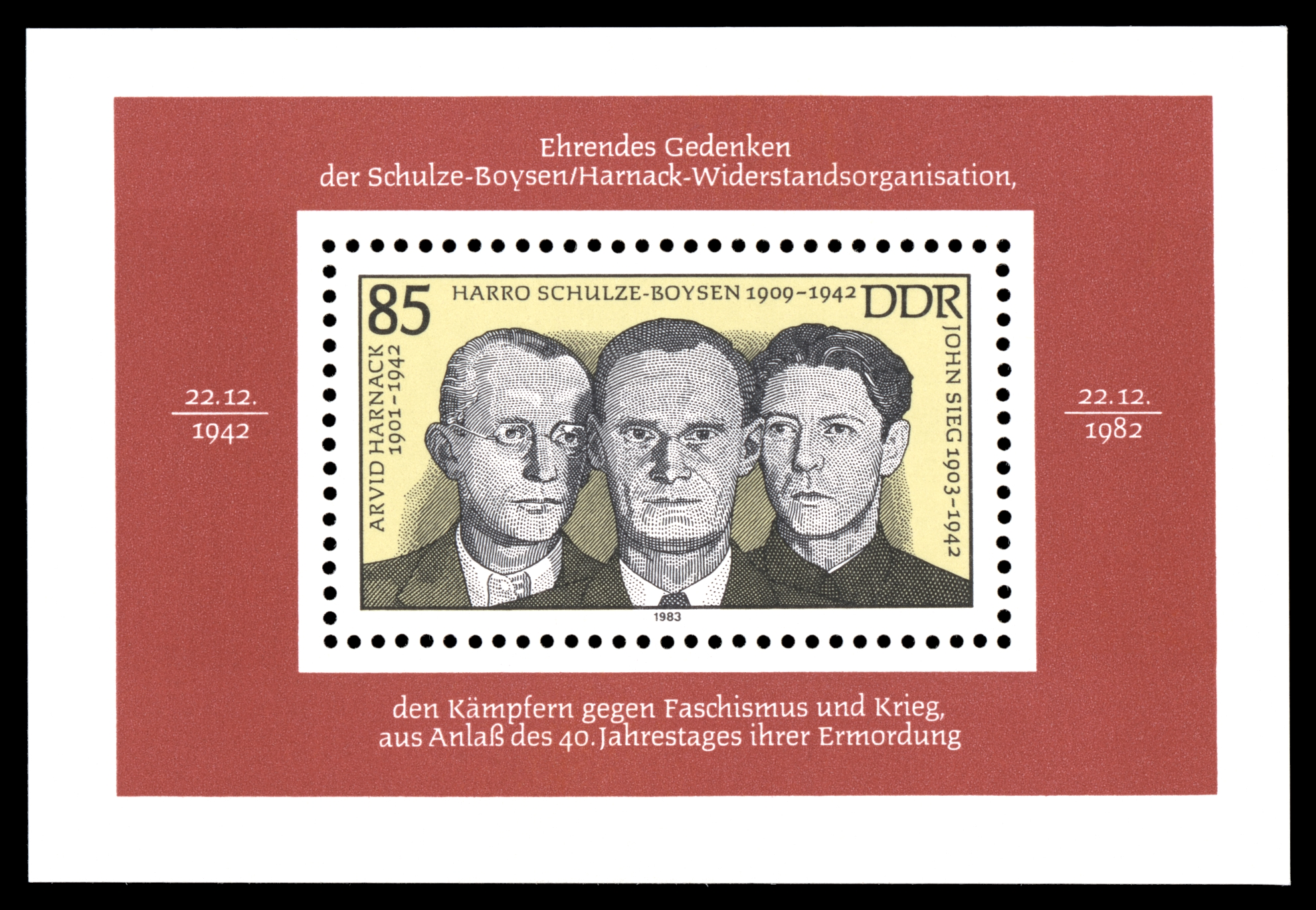
Arvid Harnack, Harro Schulze-Boysen and John Sieg on a GDR stamp

From 1949 onwards, the GDR banned the publication of everything related to Soviet intelligence. Those of the German resistance who had contact with Soviet intelligence and what information they had, remained secret. In December 1966, a plan by Erich Mielke was organised in liaison with the KGB to formerly identify the scouts and honour them. By August 1967, public appreciation of the group began in earnest when proposals for the posthumous honouring of the German group as a Scout organisation were made, that specified the award for scouts of the Red Orchestra.

In 1970, a DEFA feature film KLK an PTX... was released that portrayed the official histories of the Red Orchestra as a group dependent on the anti-fascism of the KPD and therefore only capable of joint action. Here too, the intelligence activity was overemphasised, but it was seen positively here. Since the 1960s, all biographies of the members of the Red Orchestra in the GDR have been adapted by the Stasi to give the GDR secret service a story with anti-fascist roots. The 1979 book Rote Kapelle gegen Hitler by Soviet military historian Alexander Blank and Stasi officer Julius Mader is used today as an example of a manipulated historiography. The GDR's image of history solidified the false image of the Red Orchestra in the Federal Republic as a communist spy group.

=== Historical research ===
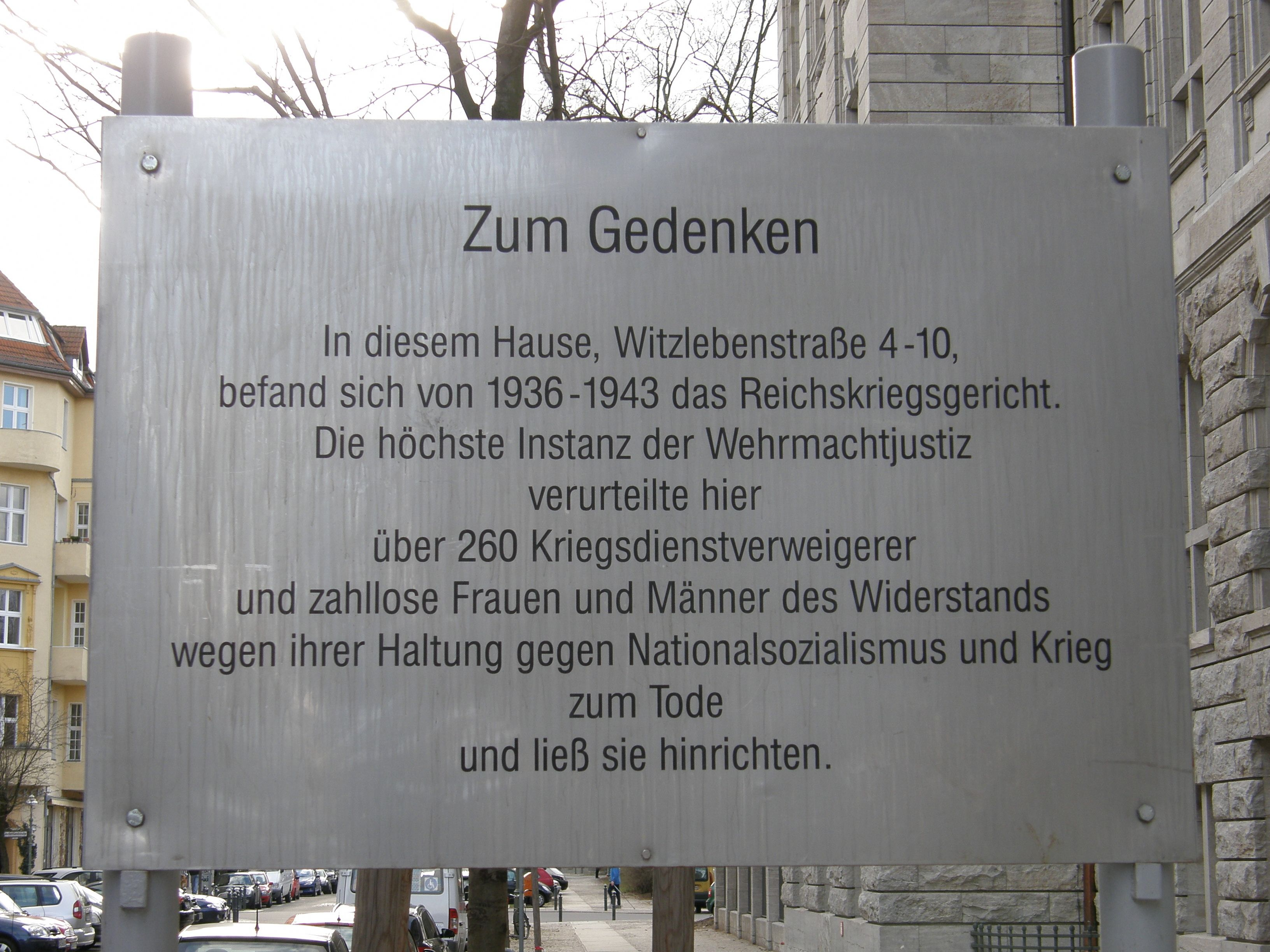
Commemorative plaque for conscientious objectors and resistance fighters at the former Reichskriegsgericht. 4—5 Witzleben Street, Charlottenburg. Erected in 1989

The first attempts to secure sources on the history of the German resistance against Nazism were made by the branches of the Union of Persecutees of the Nazi Regime in all German occupation zones. In 1948, Klaus Lehmann documented his information about the German resistance group around Shulze-Boysen and Harnack for the Union in East Berlin.

After positive appreciations of the immediate post-war period, West German historians such as Hans Rothfels and Gerhard Ritter judged the Red Orchestra. Rothfel, writing for an American audience in The German Opposition to Hitler, An Appraisal (1949), wrote for the sake of historical justice, placed the resistance fighters of the 20 July plot, as well as the Harnack group at the centre of his study. Rothfel conceded that the German resistance to Hitler was much more extensive than could have been expected under the conditions of terror and lauded the convictions of the resistance fighters and their vision of a European mission. Ritter's Carl Goerdeler and the German Resistance Movement (Carl Goerdeler und die Deutsche Widerstandsbewegung) (1954) based his work on Roeder's writing "Die Rote Kapelle" and adopted his thesis of treason. He focused more on the resisters values and ideas. Ritter stated that not every resister who was unsatisfied or criticised the Nazis could be included in the German resistance movement. He was vehement in stating that socialist opposition against the Nazi state did not deserve the honorary title of Resistance. In his evaluation he stated, The group had apparently nothing to do with German Resistance, one should have no doubts about this....Any person who can persuade a German soldier to defect or betray important secrets...is a traitor.

The situation remained decisive in the 1960s when new publications by writers Gilles Perrault and Der Spiegel journalist Heinz Höhne were published. Perrault focused more on Western European resistance cells. Höhne used a collection of 500 radio messages belonging to veteran radio cipher officer Wilhelm F. Flicke, as his research base. However, Flicke had worked for another department between 1942 and 1943 and did not learn of the Red Orchestra until 1944. In 1949 and 1953, Höhne published two books, that are now considered sensational and a form of Colportage novel without a valid source base. In the book 'Codeword: Direktor', Höhne repeated Nazi accusations in great detail including Roeder's accusations, fabrications and slander. Not a single message was sent using the faulty radios. Höhne also repeated the spurious charge that was presented by the Nazis that the group was mercenary in its nature, which was entirely false. Perrault researched extensively in newspapers and interviewed witnesses but staged his own research. Perrault also interviewed contemporary Gestapo witnesses knowing they were responsible for torture. Witnesses like Harry Piepe were paid to tell their story.

In the 1970's, the survivors of the Rote Kapelle began to write their memoirs. The first of these was Leopold Trepper's "Le grand jeu" (The Great Game). In the book, Trepper tried to construct a new personae for himself as "The Grand Chief" of Soviet espionage. In many instances he changed dates, places, the order of event and sometimes people to present a false narrative, in essence to disguise the fact that he betrayed many people to the Gestapo who were associated with the Rote Kappelle and the French PCF. French author Guillaume Bourgeois who conducted a study of the Rote Kapelle, comprehensively destroyed the accuracy of Trepper's memoir by revealing him as a Gestapo agent who used his knowledge of the Rote Kapelle to destroy it from the inside.

In 1983, historian Peter Steinbach and designer, Hans Peter Hoch were commissioned by Richard von Weizsäcker, then mayor of Berlin, to fully document the German resistance to Nazism, in all its diversity. In 1989, the Memorial to the German Resistance established a permanent exhibition on the subject.

The effort by people like Weizsäcker led to an intensification of research, but it was only with the ending of the Eastern Bloc and the collapse of the Soviet Union on 8 December 1991, that the evaluation of Soviet archive documentation on the Red Orchestra could begin, without the lens of ideology intruding. In 2002, for the first time, Hans Coppi and Soviet political historian Boris Lwowitsch Chawkin and historian Yuri N. Zorya brought to light many original documents from the Russian archives, which refuted the myth that the Harnack and Schulze-Boysen groups were a spy organisation.

In 2009, a study by American political scientist Anne Nelson that was published as a book, came to the following conclusions:

- The members viewed themselves as rebels who were enlightened.
- That after the war, the Stasi manipulated history to fit their own agenda, specifically to reinforce the prescribed German-Soviet friendship and to legitimise its own spying activity as anti-fascist.

Johannes Tuchel, Director of the Memorial to the German Resistance commented on the astonishing agreement between the east and the west, in the reception that the group received. Tuchel noted how the historical context, as defined by the Gestapo, was transported into the Cold War and as result, falsified the legacy of the group, e.g. the impressive AGIS pamphlets.

In 2017, French author Guillaume Bourgeois, published the La véritable histoire de l'Orchestre rouge, offering a thorough analysis of the Trepper group. It tries to address the lack of sources in prior years that is accomplished by a rigorous examination of German and Soviet archives, in an attempt to provide an accurate historical revision. Bourgeois's conclusion on how little strategic information came from the apparatus of the Orchestra, i.e. from Brussels or Paris, was new.

=== Karl Barth tribute ===
The theologian Karl Barth made a rare exception to the West German assessment of the 1950s when he declared the group to be a model of the church resistance because of its openness to people from different social classes, its efforts to protect Jews and the timely clarification of the War Plans of the Nazi's. In his speech to the Hessian state government during the Volkstrauertag of 1954 in Wiesbaden, he stated:

And no matter whether it suits us today or not, we shouldn't hide the fact that there was also such a thing as a 'Red Orchestra': communists who were also involved in this struggle and also fell as victims of Nazism. No matter what their ideological background was and what one might think of their particular motivations and actions: these people didn't want to be part of what the Nazis wanted; they wanted to set a limit to their depraved and ruinous regime, to put an end to it. [...] Had they succeeded, it might have rendered a large amount of further human as well as material sacrifices unnecessary. But they didn't succeed. And this was not just their own fault, but was also because so few in Germany were willing to join and help them with determination, before it became safe to do so, and that they received so little understanding or meaningful assistance from outside

These and other speeches provoked outrage and rejection in the audience at the time.

=== Painting ===
From 1936 to 1941, the artist Carl Baumann was a student at the Academy of Arts in Berlin. Baumann was also a resistance fighter, who was in contact with Schulze-Boysen. In 1941, he created Rote Kapelle Berlin, his famous painting that is located in the Stadtmuseum in Münster in which he portrays Harro Schulze-Boysen, Walter Küchenmeister and Kurt Schumacher building a bridge away from Nazism.

- Rote Kapelle Berlin (1941) Tempera on Nesse, 79×99 cm in Westphalian State Museum of Art and Cultural History in Münster.

=== Literature ===
The writer Günther Weisenborn was arrested as a member of the resistance group in 1942 and was sentenced to death, but was later reduced to ten years in prison. Weisenborn dedicated his play in three acts The Illegals (German:Die Illegalen), to the resistance group, which premiered on 21 March 1946. In it, he portrayed two organised resistance fighters as tragic individuals whose love for each other fails due to the forced isolation and secrecy of their resistance work.

The writer and artist, Peter Weiss dedicated his magnum opus, three-volume novel The Aesthetics of Resistance to the resistance from 1971 to 1981 celebrating their courage. For him, the resistance was the organisation in which it was possible to overcome the division of the labour movement into social democrats and communists in the common struggle against fascism.

=== Film ===
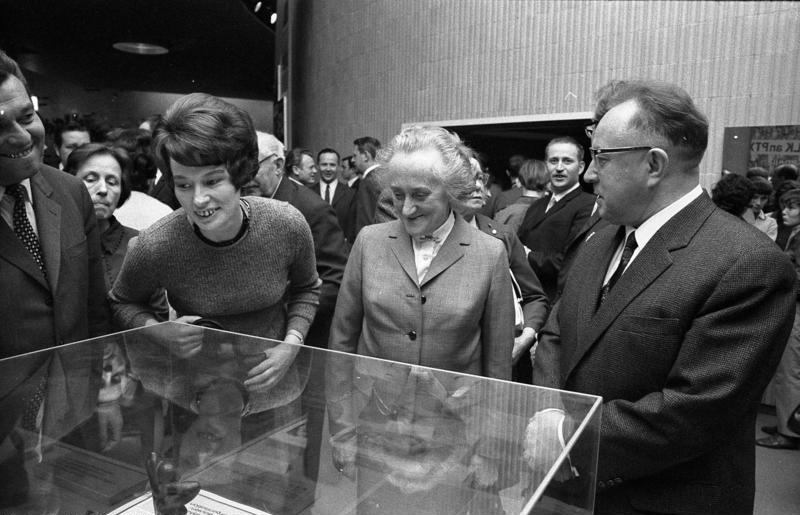
Greta Kuckhoff and Erich Mielke at the premiere of the DEFA film KLK an PTX – The Red Orchestra

In 1970, DEFA made the film KLK an PTX – Die Rote Kapelle under the direction of Horst E. Brandt based on a screenplay by Wera and Claus Küchenmeister. The Harnacks were played by Horst Drinda and Irma Münch, Horst Schulze and Barbara Adolph played the Kuckhoffs, Klaus Piontek and Jutta Wachowiak played the Schulze-Boysens.

In 1972, the ARD released the multi-part TV series Die rote Kapelle by Franz Peter Wirth based on a screenplay by Peter Adler and Hans Gottschalk.

In 1989 the Yuri Ozerov film, Stalingrad was released, in which the Red Orchestra's espionage activities are one of several storylines.

In 2003, Stefan Roloff's second documentary, The Rote Kapelle, a portrait of his late father, Helmut Roloff, a resistance fighter and companion book Rote Kapelle corrected the Cold War-shaped image for the first time and told the true story of the resistance group through interviews with survivors and contemporary witnesses. It was premiered at the Memorial to the German Resistance, followed by cinema screenings, including in Berlin and New York, where he was nominated for Best Foreign Film 2005 by the US Women Critics.

In 2017, the documentary The good enemies. My Father, the Red Orchestra and I by Christian Weisenborn was released, consisting of private film material, excerpts of letters and diaries as well as interviews with relatives and authors. Weisenborn devotes a great deal of attention to the representation of the perspective of women in the resistance group and recalls that the story of resistance is still told primarily as one of men in the resistance.

== Memorials ==
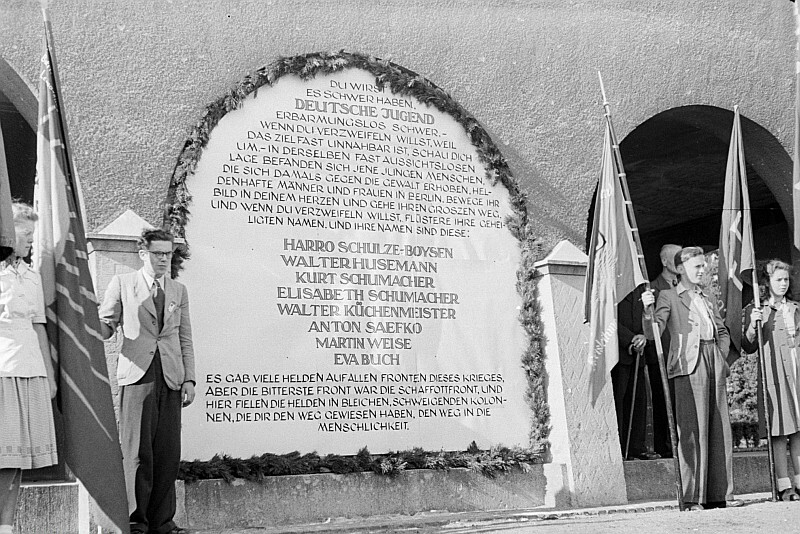
Memorial for members of the Red Orchestra in Germany in Brandeburg

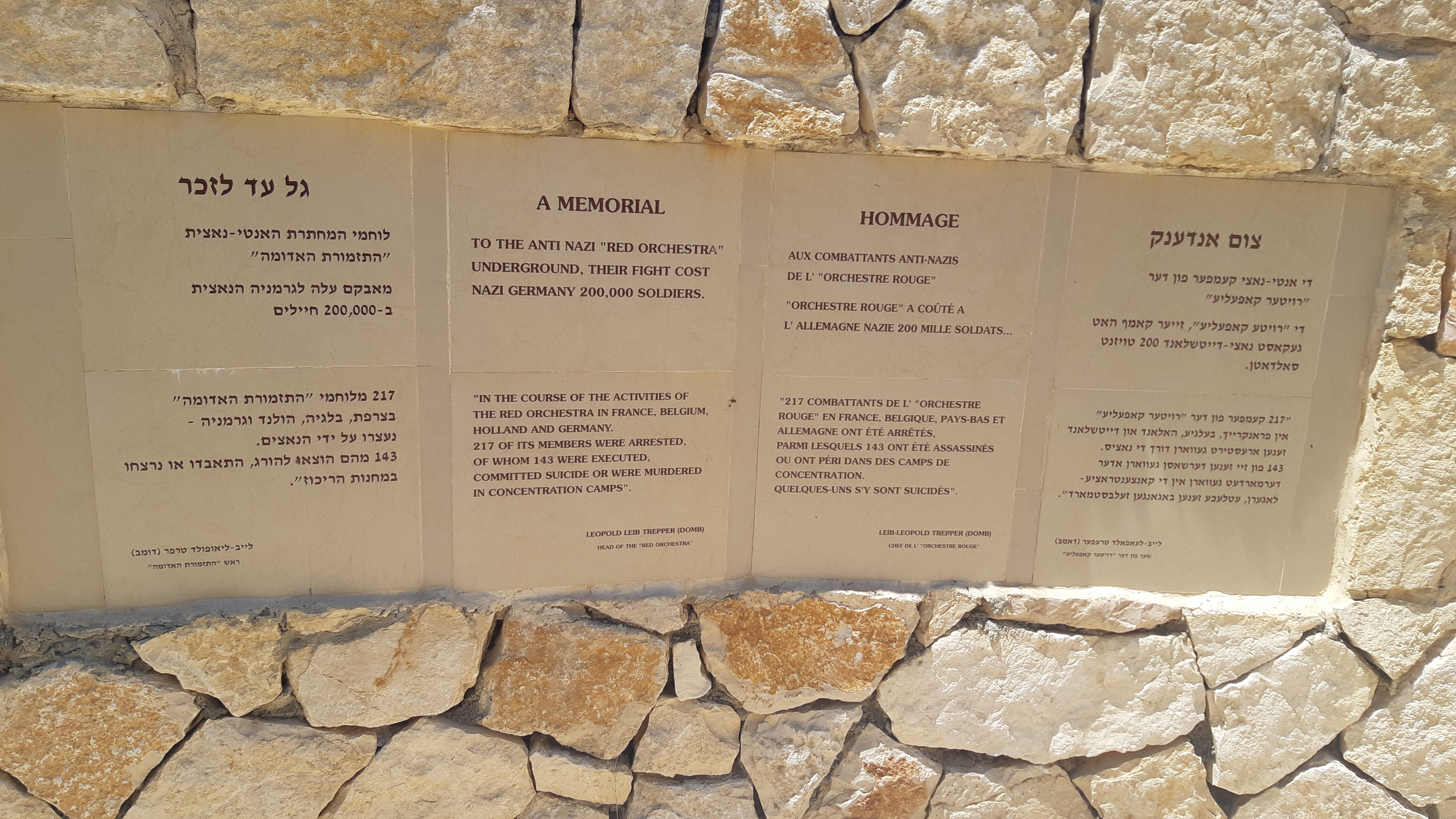
The Red Orchestra memorial in Jerusalem

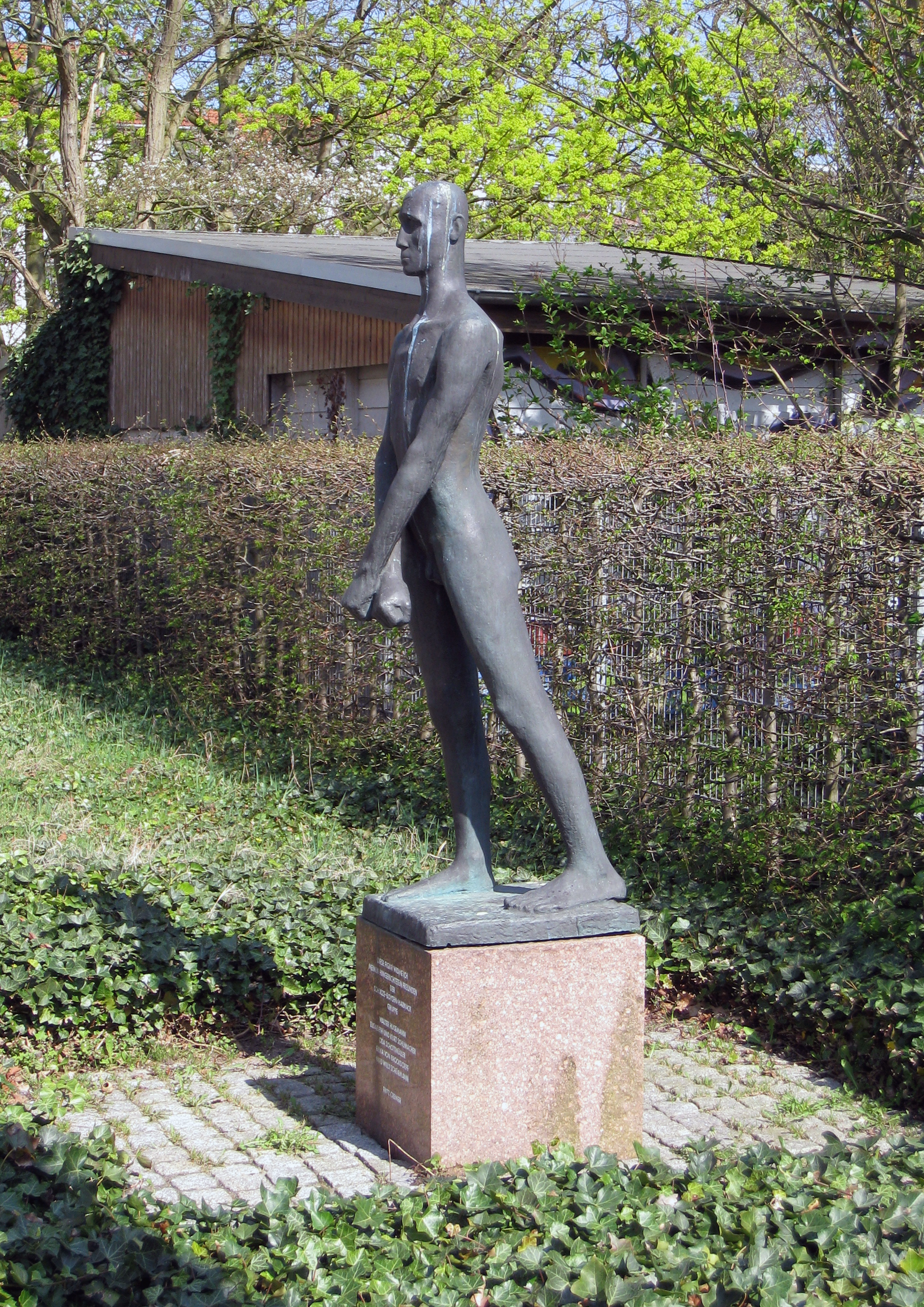
Freiheitskämpfer ("Freedom fighter"), bronze sculpture by Fritz Cremer, in Wilhelm Wagenfeld House, Bremen, Germany

== See also ==
- Schwarze Kapelle
