= Deaths in January 1999 =

The following is a list of notable deaths in January 1999.

Entries for each day are listed alphabetically by surname. A typical entry lists information in the following sequence:

- Name, age, country of citizenship at birth, subsequent country of citizenship (if applicable), reason for notability, cause of death (if known), and reference.

== January 1999 ==
=== 1 ===
- Myslym Alla, 79, Albanian football player and manager.
- Vítor Baptista, 50, Portuguese footballer.
- Len Dondero, 95, American baseball player (St. Louis Browns).
- Besim Fagu, 73, Albanian football player.
- Helena Fliśnik, 46, Polish Olympic sprinter (1972).
- Rafael Iglesias, 74, Argentine heavyweight boxer and Olympian (1948).
- Les Yewdale, 70, Australian politician.

=== 2 ===
- Amin al-Majaj, 77, Palestinian politician, Mayor of Jerusalem (1994–1998).
- Stanley Bissell, 92, English wrestler and Olympian (1948).
- Margot Cottens, 76, Uruguayan actress.
- Jean Galbraith, 92, Australian botanist, children's writer, and poet.
- Sebastian Haffner, 91, German journalist and author.
- Niels Kristensen, 78, Danish rower and Olympian (1952).
- Rolf Liebermann, 88, Swiss composer and music administrator.
- Aase Lionæs, 91, Norwegian politician and feminist.
- Joan Long, 73, Australian producer and writer.
- Rags Matthews, 93, American college football player (TCU Horned Frogs).
- Shepard Menken, 77, American voice actor.
- Trevor J. Rees, 85, American football player and coach.
- Horst Seeger, 72, German musicologist, librettist and opera director.
- George Tobin, 77, American football player (New York Giants).
- Louis Jolyon West, 74, American psychiatrist, cancer.

=== 3 ===
- Elsa Burnett, 96, Swedish actress.
- Diana Dei, 84, Italian film actress.
- Neil Gibson, 36, New Zealand rower and Olympian (1988), cancer.
- Otto Königsberger, 90, German architect.
- Violet Rose Olney, 87, English athlete and Olympic medalist (1936).
- Chuck Parsons, 74, American sports car racing driver.
- Stanley Proffitt, 88, English cricketer.
- Jerry Quarry, 53, American heavyweight boxer, pneumonia.
- Jim Still, 74, American football player (Buffalo Bills).
- Jack C. K. Teng, 86, Chinese educator, writer and politician.
- Gorō Yamaguchi, 65, Japanese shakuhachi player.

=== 4 ===
- Maqsood Ahmed, 73, Pakistani cricketer.
- Iron Eyes Cody, 94, American actor.
- Diane Foster, 70, Canadian track and field athlete and Olympian (1948).
- Jean Krombach, 88, Luxembourgian Olympic sprinter (1936).
- Fredrik Mellbye, 81, Norwegian physician.
- Charles Manners, 10th Duke of Rutland, 79, British peer and landowner.
- Kisshomaru Ueshiba, 77, Japanese master of aikido, respiratory failure.
- José Vela Zanetti, 85, Spanish painter and muralist.

=== 5 ===
- Charles Francis Adams IV, 88, American electronics industrialist.
- Buck Batterman, 80, American basketball player.
- Paul Wallace Gates, 97, American historian and academic.
- Michael Hirschfeld, 54, New Zealand businessman and politician, diabetes complications.
- Jarmila Nygrýnová, 45, Czech long jumper and Olympian (1972, 1976, 1980), cancer.
- Ralph Pasquariello, 72, American football player (Los Angeles Rams, Chicago Cardinals).
- Clare Potter, 95, American fashion designer.
- Basuki Resobowo, 82–83, Indonesian painter.
- Paul Zoll, 87, American cardiologist.

=== 6 ===
- David W. Dennis, 86, American politician, Representative from Indiana (1969–1975).
- Jim Dunn, 67, American baseball player (Pittsburgh Pirates).
- Joseph Malta, 80, American executioner during the Nuremberg executions.
- Ntsu Mokhehle, 80, Lesotho politician, Prime Minister (1993–1994, 1994–1998).
- Henrietta Moraes, 67, British artists' model and memoirist.
- Hélène Ouvrard, 60, Canadian French writer.
- Michel Petrucciani, 36, French jazz pianist, pulmonary infection.
- Antonio Pierfederici, 79, Italian actor.
- Lajos Tichy, 63, Hungarian footballer.
- Leo Weilenmann, 76, Swiss racing cyclist.

=== 7 ===
- Phil Cutchin, 78, American football player and coach.
- Hernán Fuentes, 80, Chilean Olympic pentathlete (1948, 1952).
- James Hammerstein, 67, American theatre director and producer, heart failure.
- Fred Hopkins, 51, American jazz double bassist.
- Aulis Manninen, 81, American Olympic long-distance runner (1948).
- Fritz Ruland, 84, German Olympic cyclist (1936).
- Viktor Sobolev, 83, Soviet/Russian scientist.

=== 8 ===
- James William Baskin, 79, Canadian politician and businessman.
- Punch Coomaraswamy, 74, Malaysian–Singaporean judge, diplomat and politician, pulmonary disease.
- Harvey Miller, 63, American actor, director, and screenwriter.
- Vahid Musayev, 51, Azerbaijani politician, Deputy Minister, killed.
- Lyusyena Ovchinnikova, 67, Soviet-born Russian film actress.
- John W. Roberts, 78, American General in the United States Air Force.
- Rövşən Rzayev, 29, Azerbaijani officer and war hero, murdered.
- Peter Seeberg, 73, Danish modernist novelist and playwright.
- Dobie Gillis Williams, 38, American convicted murderer, execution by lethal injection.

=== 9 ===
- Rick Bennewitz, 62, American television director, heart failure.
- Hans Candrian, 60, Swiss bobsledder and Olympic medalist (1968, 1972).
- Joyce Chiang, 28, American attorney.
- Cleveland Cram, 81, American historian and intelligence official in the Central Intelligence Agency.
- Carl Elliott, 85, American politician, Representative from Alabama (1949–1963, 1963–1965).
- Buck Felder, 83, American baseball player.
- Mel Pearson, 60, Canadian ice hockey player (New York Rangers, Pittsburgh Penguins).
- Jim Peters, 80, English long-distance runner and Olympian (1948, 1952).
- Mien Ruys, 94, Dutch landscape and garden architect.

=== 10 ===
- Shinsuke Ashida, 84, Japanese actor, liver cancer.
- Herta Frey-Dexler, 81, Swiss Olympic figure skater (1936).
- John Hervey, 7th Marquess of Bristol, 44, British peer, aristocrat and businessman, multiple organ failure.
- Walter Edward Harris, 94, Canadian politician and lawyer.
- Esteban Marino, 84, Uruguayan football referee.
- Frank Parker, 95, American singer and actor.
- Bert Piggott, 78, American football player (Los Angeles Dons), and coach.
- Primož Ramovš, 77, Slovenian composer and librarian.
- Gavin Relly, 72, South African businessman, Chairman of Anglo American.
- Edward Williams, 77, Australian judge on the Supreme Court of Queensland.
- Juliusz Żuławski, 88, Polish poet, literary critic and translator.

=== 11 ===
- Teuvo Aura, 86, Finnish politician.
- Fabrizio De André, 58, Italian singer-songwriter, lung cancer.
- Robert Douglas, 89, American film actor, television director and producer.
- Ján Ducký, 54, Slovak politician, shot.
- Jim Dyck, 76, American baseball player.
- Nathalie Lind, 80, Danish jurist and politician.
- Naomi Mitchison, 101, Scottish novelist and poet.
- Brian Moore, 77, Northern Irish-born Canadian screenwriter and novelist, pulmonary fibrosis.
- Josefina Plá, 95, Spanish poet, playwright and art critic.
- K. A. Rahman, 59, Indian political activist.
- Öztürk Serengil, 68, Turkish actor and comedian.
- Bobby Specht, 77, American figure skater.
- François Spoerry, 86, French architect and urban planner.
- Mark Warren, 60, American television director (Rowan & Martin's Laugh-In, What's Happening!!, Sanford and Son), cancer.

=== 12 ===
- Allen Adkins, 69, American racing driver.
- Roland L. Bragg, 75, American Army paratrooper and namesake of Fort Bragg from 2025 onward, cancer.
- Leo Cherne, 86, American economist and public servant.
- Betty Lou Gerson, 84, American actress (One Hundred and One Dalmatians, The Fly, Cats Don't Dance), stroke.
- David Logan, 42, American gridiron football player (Tampa Bay Buccaneers, Green Bay Packers), respiratory failure.
- Gerda Ring, 107, Norwegian stage actress and producer.
- Maria Sander, 74, German sprinter and Olympian (1952, 1956).
- Charlie Skeen, 49, American actor and stuntman.
- William H. Whyte, 81, American urbanist, organizational analyst and journalist.
- Doug Wickenheiser, 37, Canadian ice hockey player (Montreal Canadiens, St. Louis Blues, Washington Capitals), cancer.

=== 13 ===
- Maurice A. Donahue, 80, American politician.
- Colin Hickey, 67, Australian Olympic speed skater (1952, 1956, 1960).
- Buzz Kulik, 76, American film director and producer.
- Karl Lieffen, 72, German film actor, brain cancer.
- Kelvin Malone, 38, American spree killer, execution by lethal injection.
- John Frederick Nims, 85, American poet and academic.
- Lawrence Harold Welsh, 63, American bishop in the Roman Catholic Church.

=== 14 ===
- Robin Bailey, 79, English actor, respiratory failure.
- Tom Binford, 74, American entrepreneur and philanthropist.
- Henry Carroll, 93, American soccer player and Olympian (1928).
- Roger Gill, 58, American football player (Philadelphia Eagles).
- Jerzy Grotowski, 65, Polish theatre director and theorist, leukaemia.
- Janus Hellemons, 86, Dutch racing cyclist.
- Brett King, 78, American actor, leukaemia, leukemia.
- Louise Kirtland, 93, American actress
- Muslimgauze, 37, British electronic musician, fungal infection.
- Fred Myrow, 59, American composer, heart failure.
- Sabina Olmos, 85, Argentine film actress.
- Raymond Peynet, 90, French cartoonist.
- Granville Rodrigo, 41, Sri Lankan actor, singer, and art director.
- Barat Shakinskaya, 84, Soviet-Azerbaijani actress.
- Lincoln Thompson, 49, Jamaican reggae singer-songwriter, cancer.
- Aldo van Eyck, 80, Dutch architect.

=== 15 ===
- John Bloom, 54, American actor, heart failure.
- Betty Box, 83, British film producer, cancer.
- Doyle Cofer, 75, American basketball player.
- Oscar Georgy, 82, American baseball player (New York Giants).
- Lars Glassér, 73, Swedish sprint canoeist and Olympian (1952).
- Bob Gonya, 88, American football player (Philadelphia Eagles).
- Monroe Karmin, 69, American journalist and Pulitzer Prize winner.
- Robert Lowry, Baron Lowry, 79, Irish judge and life peer, Lord Chief Justice of Northern Ireland (1971–1988).
- Marion Ryan, 67, English pop singer.
- John Baker Saunders, 44, American musician (Mad Season), heroin overdose.
- Mi. Pa. Somasundaram, 77, Indian Tamil journalist, poet and writer.

=== 16 ===
- Jesse Baker, 41, American football player (Houston Oilers, Dallas Cowboys).
- Oscar Cullmann, 96, French Lutheran theologian.
- Đoàn Khuê, 75, Vietnamese army general and Minister of Defence (1992-1997).
- Jim McClelland, 83, Australian jurist and politician, Senator for New South Wales (1971–1978).
- Dadie Rylands, 96, British literary scholar and theatre director.

=== 17 ===
- Cay von Brockdorff, 83, German sculptor and art historian.
- Maurice Byers, 81, Australian jurist and constitutional expert.
- Nicholas J. Corea, 55, American television writer (Walker, Texas Ranger, The Incredible Hulk, Outlaws), cancer.
- Theodore Major, 90, English artist.
- Claire Schillace, 77, American baseball player.

=== 18 ===
- Horace Cumner, 80, Welsh footballer.
- Ciril Cvetko, 79, Slovene composer and conductor.
- Frances Gershwin, 92, American singer and violinist.
- Lucille Kallen, 76, American screenwriter and playwright, cancer.
- Pat Morton, 88, Australian businessman and politician, Leader of the Opposition of New South Wales (1955–1959).
- Henri Romagnesi, 86, French mycologist.
- Harrie Schoenmakers, 83, Dutch racing cyclist.
- Günter Strack, 69, German television actor, heart failure.
- Virginia Verrill, 82, American big band singer.

=== 19 ===
- Robert Eugene Brashers, 40, American serial killer, suicide by gunshot.
- Tom Chantiles, 82, American football player (Detroit Lions).
- Roderick Chisholm, 82, American philosopher.
- Ivan Francescato, 31, Italian rugby player, heart failure.
- Mario Gentili, 85, Italian cyclist and Olympic medalist.
- Jacques Lecoq, 77, French actor and mime, cerebral haemorrhage.
- Warren Schrage, 78, American basketball player.

=== 20 ===
- Stella Bloch, 101, American artist, dancer and journalist.
- Cleaver Bunton, 96, Australian politician, mayor of Albury (NSW).
- Martyn Finlay, 87, New Zealand lawyer and politician.
- John Golding, 67, British trade unionist and politician, Member of Parliament (1969–1986), complications following surgery.
- Frances Lander Spain, 95, American children's librarian.

=== 21 ===
- Alfonso Corona Blake, 80, Mexican film director and screenwriter.
- Charles Brown, 76, American blues singer and pianist, heart failure.
- Berkeley L. Bunker, 92, American politician, Senator (1940–1942) from Nevada and Representative (1945–1947).
- Jacques Chailley, 88, French musicologist and composer.
- Iwashita Eiichi, 43, Japanese sumo wrestler.
- Leslie French, 94, British actor.
- Johann Koller, 77, Austrian Olympic field hockey player (1948, 1952).
- Paul Metcalf, 81, American writer.
- Lloyd M. Mustin, 87, American admiral during World War II, complications following a stroke.
- Marvin Rick, 97, American middle-distance runner and Olympian (1924).
- Mickey Sanzotta, 77, American football player (Detroit Lions).
- Cecil Smith, 94, American polo player.
- Susan Strasberg, 60, American actress, breast cancer.

=== 22 ===
- Paul Cammermans, 77, Belgian film director.
- Gabor Carelli, 83, Hungarian classical tenor.
- Piero Gadda Conti, 96, Italian novelist and film critic.
- Larry Flood, 86, Irish Olympic boxer (1932).
- George Mosse, 80, German writer and historian.
- Graciela Quan, 87/88, Guatemalan lawyer and women's rights activist.
- Maxwell Rosenlicht, 74, American mathematician.
- Steven Sykes, 84, British artist.

=== 23 ===
- Bernard Budiansky, 73, American engineer and academic.
- Joe D'Amato, 62, Italian film director, heart failure.
- Charles England, 77, American baseball player.
- Jaroslav Foglar, 91, Czech author.
- Antoine Franckx, 90, Belgian footballer.
- Pavle Grubješić, 45, Serbian football player.
- Ned Lehac, 99, American composer and songwriter
- Terence Lewin, Baron Lewin, 78, British Royal Navy officer, First Sea Lord (1977–1979).
- Thomas C. Mann, 86, American diplomat and ambassador.
- Paul McKee, 75, American football player (Washington Redskins).
- John Osteen, 77, American evangelical pastor, heart failure.
- Fritz Poitsch, 72, German Olympic ice hockey player (1952).
- Suceso Portales, 94, Spanish anarcho-feminist writer.
- Jay Pritzker, 76, American entrepreneur and member of the Pritzker family.
- Frederick Sommer, 93, Italian-American artist.
- Graham Staines, 58, Australian Christian missionary, burned.

=== 24 ===
- Andrée Debar, 78, French actress and producer of stage and screen, Alzheimer's disease.
- Elena Dobronravova, 66, Soviet and Russian actress.
- Werner Jacobs, 89, German film director.
- Bob Kauf, 56, American racing driver.
- Shizue Natsukawa, 89, Japanese actress.
- Roger Rondeaux, 78, French cyclo-cross racer.

=== 25 ===
- Sarah Louise Delany, 109, American author and civil rights activist.
- John H. DeWitt, Jr., 92, American radio astronomy and photometry pioneer .
- Rudi Glöckner, 69, German football referee.
- Vilen Kalyuta, 76, Hungarian Olympic boxer (1948).
- José Luis Marello, 33, Argentine canoeist and Olympian (1988, 1992).
- Philip Mason, 92, English civil servant, historian, and author.
- Henri Rochereau, 90, French politician, European Commissioner for Overseas Development.
- Robert Shaw, 82, American conductor, stroke.
- George Gilbert Swell, 75, Indian politician.
- Herman Wedemeyer, 74, American actor, football player and politician, heart failure.

=== 26 ===
- Hélène Bons, 95, French Olympic high jumper (1928).
- Jeanne-Marie Darré, 93, French classical pianist.
- Walter Dossenbach, 76, Swiss Olympic weightlifter (1952).
- August Everding, 70, German opera director.
- Sam Jones, 75, Australian politician.
- Simon Karas, 93, Greek musicologist.
- D. C. Kizhakemuri, 85, Indian writer, publisher and activist.
- Matilde Landeta, 88, Mexican filmmaker and screenwriter.
- Heinz Leymann, 66, Swedish psychologists and academic.
- Larry Loughlin, 57, American baseball player (Philadelphia Phillies).
- Charles Luckman, 89, American businessman and architect.
- Ruby Mercer, 92, American-Canadian writer, broadcaster and soprano.
- Tomeju Uruma, 96, Japanese Olympic speed skater (1932).
- Irén Zságot, 74, Hungarian Olympic diver (1948).

=== 27 ===
- Gonzalo Torrente Ballester, 88, Spanish writer.
- Eamon Collins, 44-45, Northern Irish former IRA member, beaten.
- Ben Margolis, 88, American attorney, heart failure.
- Satya Saha, 64, Bangladeshi composer.
- Jerzy Turowicz, 86, Polish Catholic journalist and editor, heart failure.
- František Vláčil, 74, Czech film director, painter, and graphic artist.
- Woody Watson, 50, American actor.

=== 28 ===
- Ave Daniell, 84, American gridiron football player (Brooklyn Dodgers, Green Bay Packers).
- Josef Doležal, 78, Czechoslovak athlete and Olympic medalist (1952, 1956, 1960).
- Valery Gavrilin, 59, Soviet-born Russian composer.
- Herbert Gruber, 85, Austrian film producer.
- Pochiah Krishnamurthy, 51, Indian cricket player.
- Roger-Jean Le Nizerhy, 82, French cyclist and Olympian (1936).
- Leonard C. Lewin, 82, American author.
- McAllister Lonnon, 82, English rower and Olympian (1936).
- Rouiched, 77, Algerian comic actor.
- Torgny T:son Segerstedt, 90, Swedish philosopher and sociologist.
- Radúz Činčera, 75, Czech screenwriter and director.

=== 29 ===
- Willy Bandholz, 86, German field handball player and Olympic champion (1936).
- Volodymyr Brazhnyk, 74, Soviet Ukrainian Olympic pole vaulter (1952).
- Erik Carlsen, 87, Danish Olympic equestian (1948).
- Lili St. Cyr, 80, American burlesque stripteaser.
- Yves Hervouet, 77, French sinologist.
- Vladimir Kirillin, 86, Soviet physicist.
- István Molnár, 61, Hungarian Olympic volleyball player (1964).
- Hilmar Þorbjörnsson, 64, Icelandic Olympic sprinter (1956, 1960).
- Eeva-Kaarina Volanen, 78, Finnish actor.

=== 30 ===
- Branko Fučić, 78, Croatian art historian, archeologist and paleographer.
- Romano Garagnani, 61, Italian skeet shooter and Olympic medalist (1968, 1972, 1976, 1980).
- Mills E. Godwin, 84, American politician, Governor of Virginia (1966–1970, 1974–1978), pneumonia.
- Huntz Hall, 78, American actor, heart failure.
- Ed Herlihy, 89, American newsreel narrator.
- Chuck Hinton, 59, American gridiron football player (Pittsburgh Steelers, New York Jets, Baltimore Colts).
- Mirra Komarovsky, 93, American sociologist.
- Dolf van der Linden, 83, Dutch conductor of popular music.
- Mick McGahey, 73, Scottish trade unionist and political activist, Chairman of the Communist Party of Great Britain (1974–1978).
- Warren Miller, 74, American political scientist.
- Svetlana Savyolova, 57, Soviet and Russian actress.

=== 31 ===
- Giant Baba, 61, Japanese wrestler, liver failure.
- Michael Doughty, 66, British field hockey player and Olympian (1956).
- Bill Luders, 89, American naval architect.
- Charles M. Murphy, 85, American football, basketball and baseball player and coach.
- Ahmad Azari Qomi, 74, Iranian cleric and ayatollah.
- Fanély Revoil, 92, French opera singer.
- Gabriel Ruiz, 90, Mexican songwriter.
- Ilmari Tapiovaara, 84, Finnish furniture designer.
- Ferdinand Thomas Unger, 84, American Army Lieutenant General.
- Norm Zauchin, 69, American baseball player (Boston Red Sox, Washington Senators), prostate cancer.
