= Skeen (surname) =

Skeen is a surname which may refer to:

- Sir Andrew Skeen (1873–1935), British Indian Army general
- Andrew Skeen (Rhodesia) (c.1906–1984), British Indian Army officer and Rhodesian politician
- Buren Skeen (1936–1965), American NASCAR driver
- Charlie Skeen (1949–1999), American actor and stuntman
- Clifton Skeen (1927–1993), Ohio politician
- Dale Skeen (born c. 1955), American computer scientist
- Dick Skeen (1906–1990), American professional tennis player
- Henry Gene Skeen (1933–2006), U.S. Army general
- Jack Skeen (1928–2001), New Zealand rugby union player
- Jacob Skeen (born 1993), New Zealand rugby union player
- Jamie Skeen (born 1988), American professional basketball player
- Jane Skeen, New Zealand paediatric oncologist
- Joe Skeen (1927–2003), American politician
- Kasete Naufahu Skeen (born 1982), Tongan alpine skier
- Ken Skeen (born 1942), English footballer
- Mike Skeen (born 1986), American professional sports car racing driver
- Odean Skeen (born 1994), Jamaican sprinter
- W. L. H. Skeen (1847–1903), an English photographer in Ceylon (now Sri Lanka)
