= Skeen =

Skeen may refer to:

- Skeen (surname)
- Skeen, an alternative name for the Skinpah
