= Brockdorff =

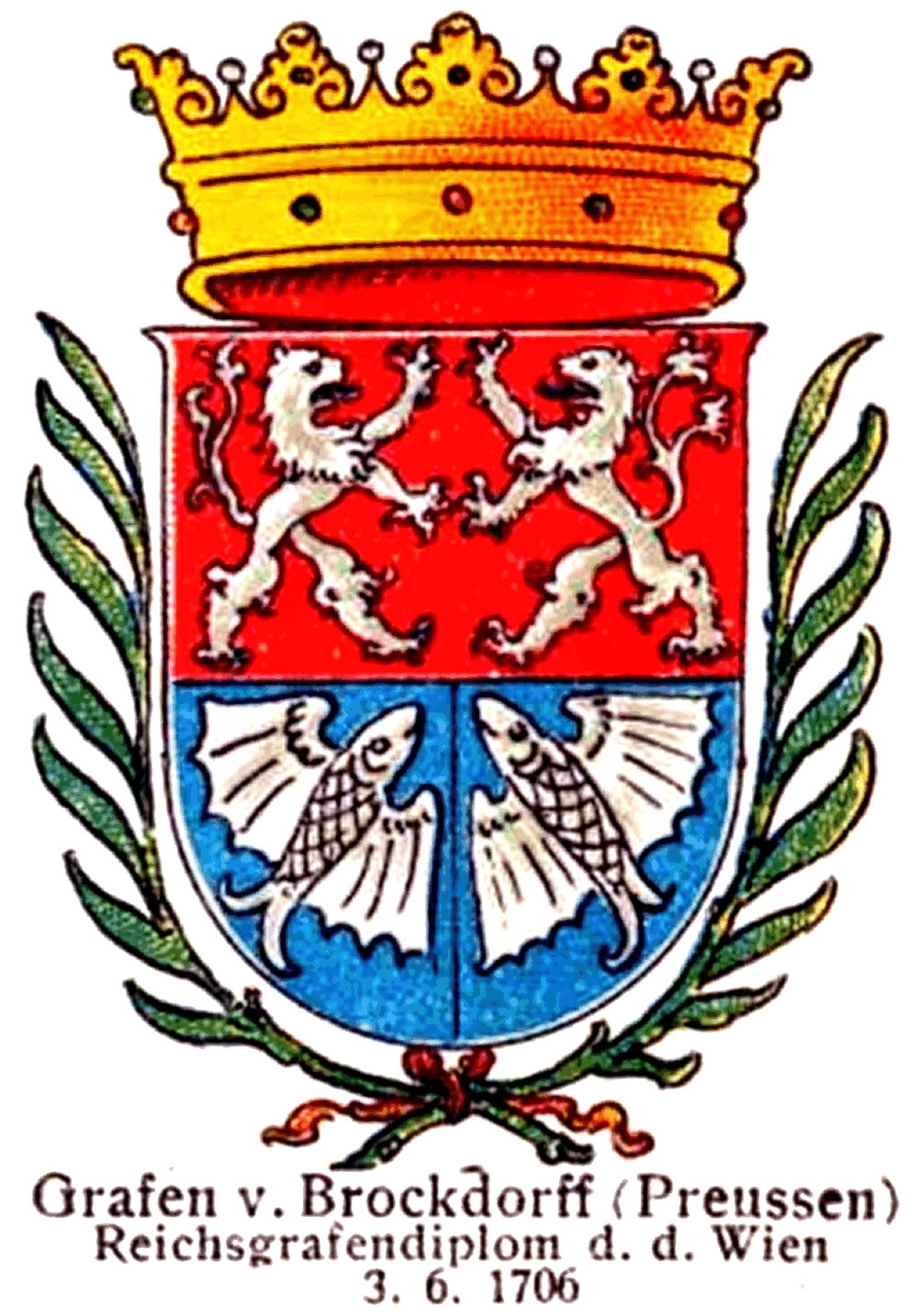
Arms of the Counts von Brockdorff

The Brockdorff family is an ancient Schleswig-Holsteiner noble house that belonged to German and Danish nobility.

== History ==
It first appeared in a document from 1167 where Eilwardus de Bruchthorp was mentioned by Duke Henry the Lion of Saxony. Members of the family founded Brokdorf, Holstein, now part of Germany, from where the family originated.

== Titles ==
On 24 May 1672 the family was granted the title of Lensgreve by King Christian V of Denmark heritable by masculine primogeniture, while on 3 June 1706 the family was awarded with the title of Imperial Count by Joseph I, Holy Roman Emperor.

Later, in 19th century the family also obtained the hereditary title of Count in the Kingdom of Prussia.

== Iuel-Brockdorff ==
The Juel-Brockdorff branch was established on February 18, 1812, through a Danish royal decree following the marriage of Baron Carl Juel, owner of Valdemar's Castle, to Baroness Sophie Frederikke Stieglitz-Brockdorff, the sole heiress to the Barony of Scheelenborg. This royal patent officially merged the names, titles, and vast estates of both noble families to ensure the continuation of the Brockdorff lineage through the Juel descendants. Today, this branch of the family also owns Meilgaard Castle.

== Properties and former properties of the Counts von Brockdorff ==
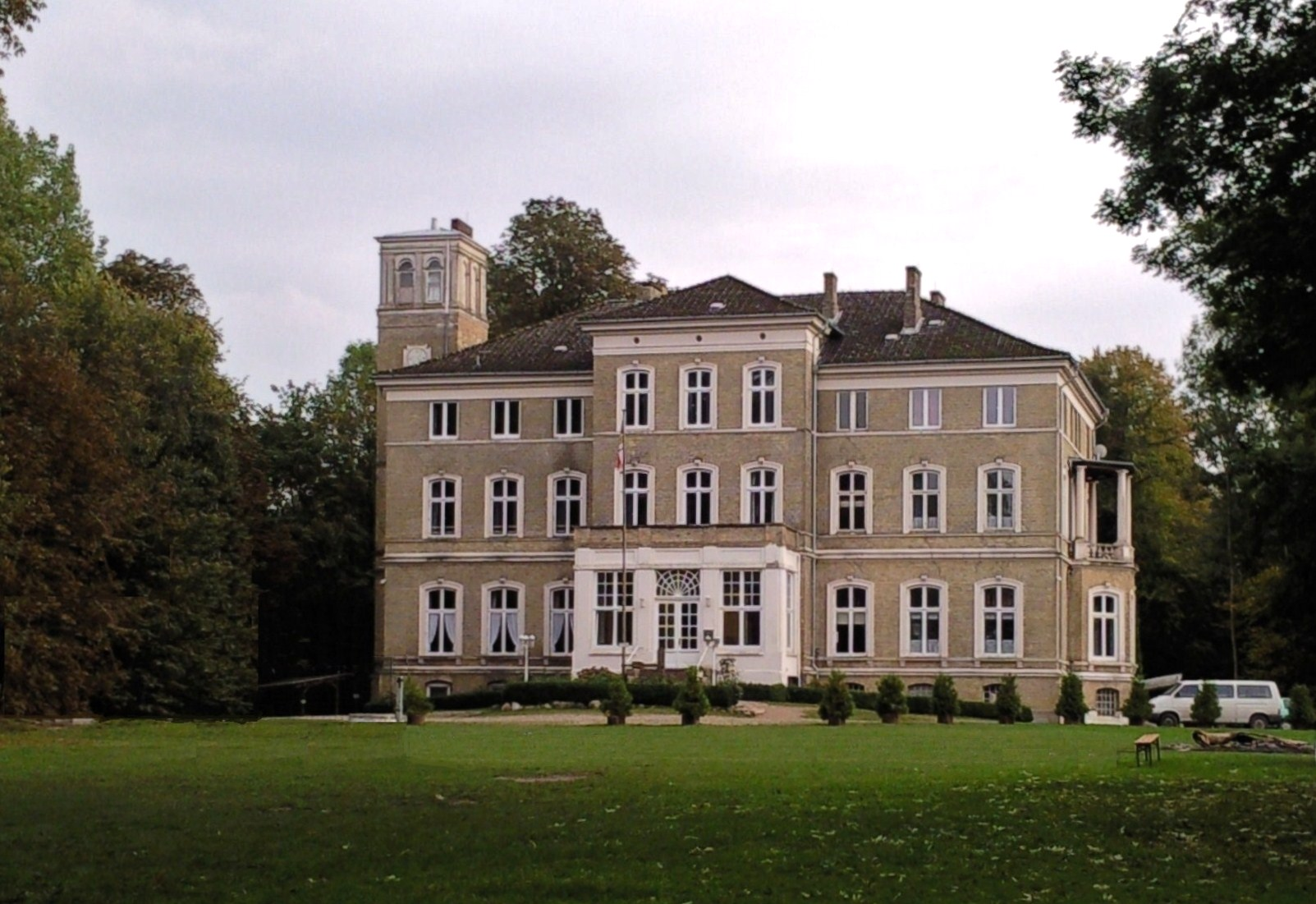
Castle Ascheberg, owned until today by descendants of Count Konrad von Brockdorff-Ahlefeldt

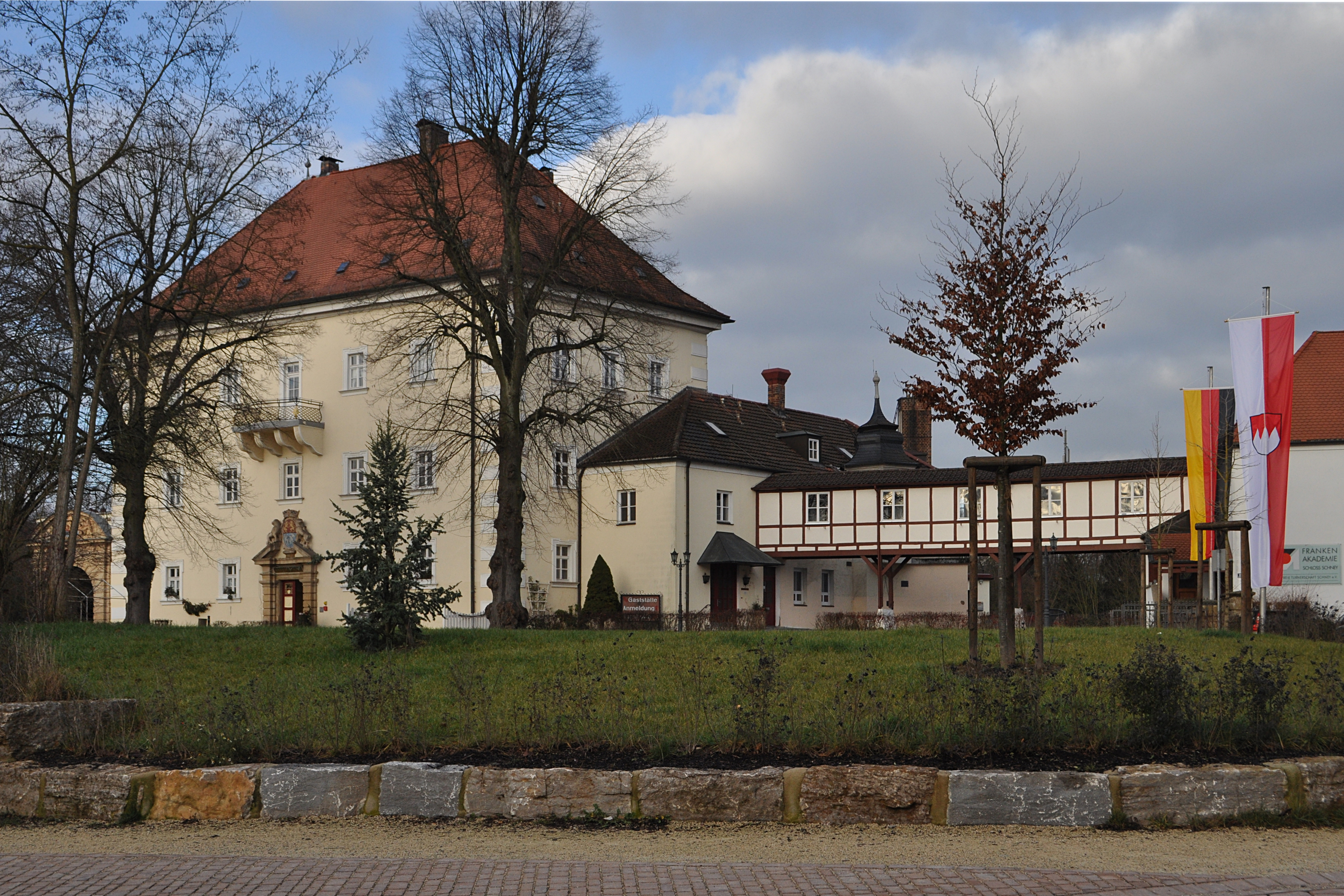
Castle Schney, from 1706 until 1873 owned by Brockdorff family

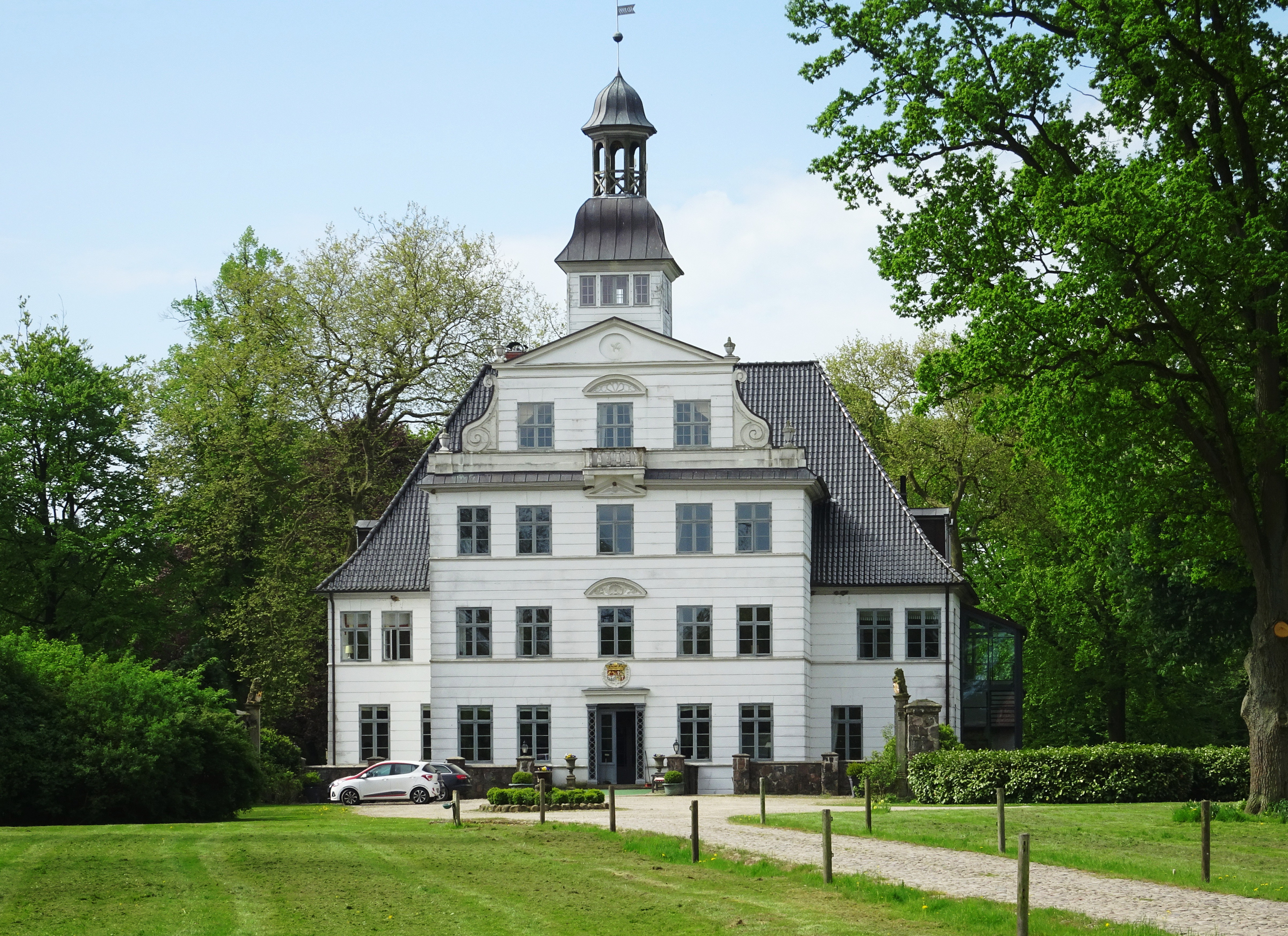
Castle Kletkamp, front facade, from 1612 until today owned by Brockdorff family

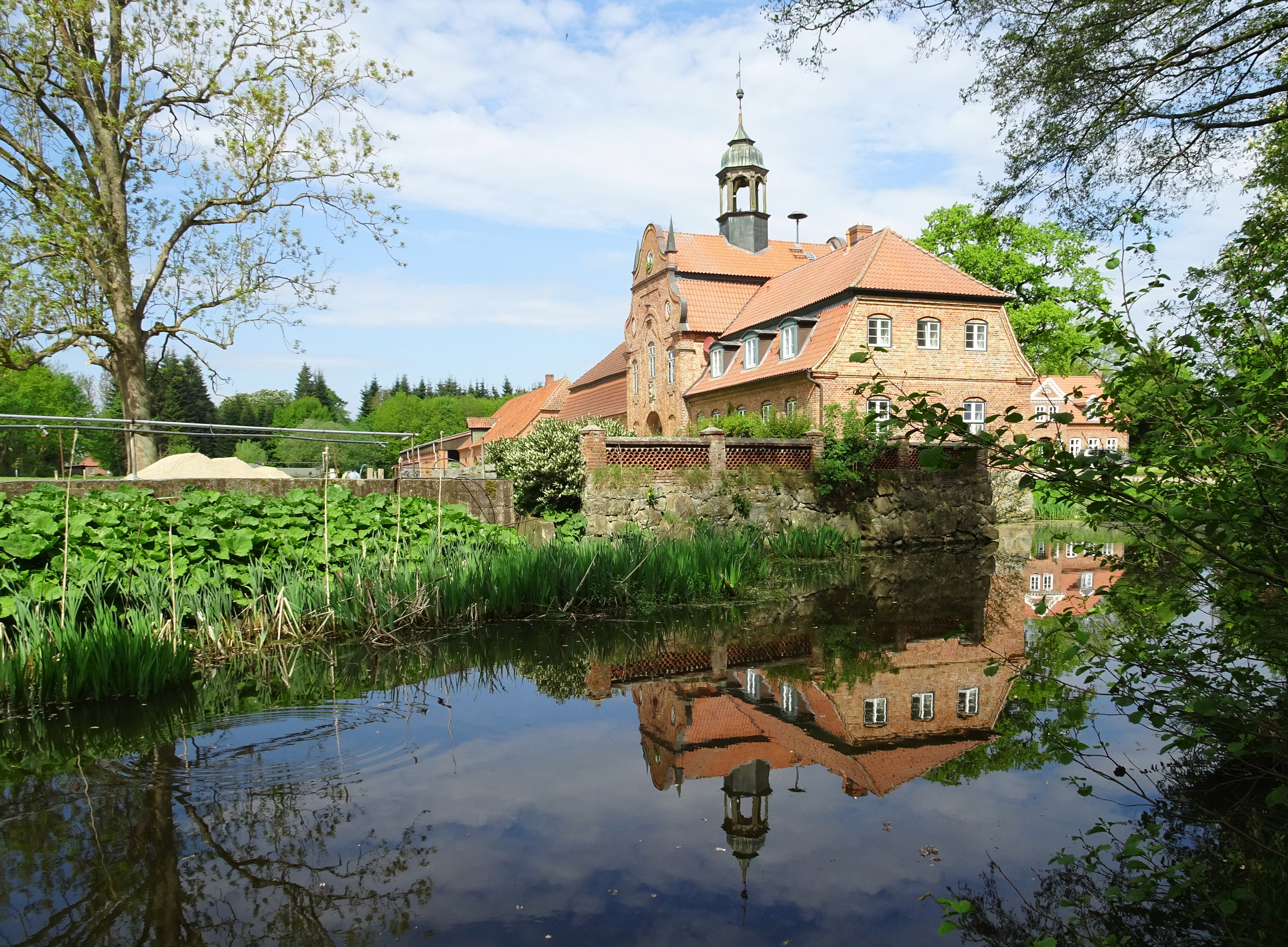
Castle Kletkamp, entrance tower, from 1612 until today owned by Brockdorff family

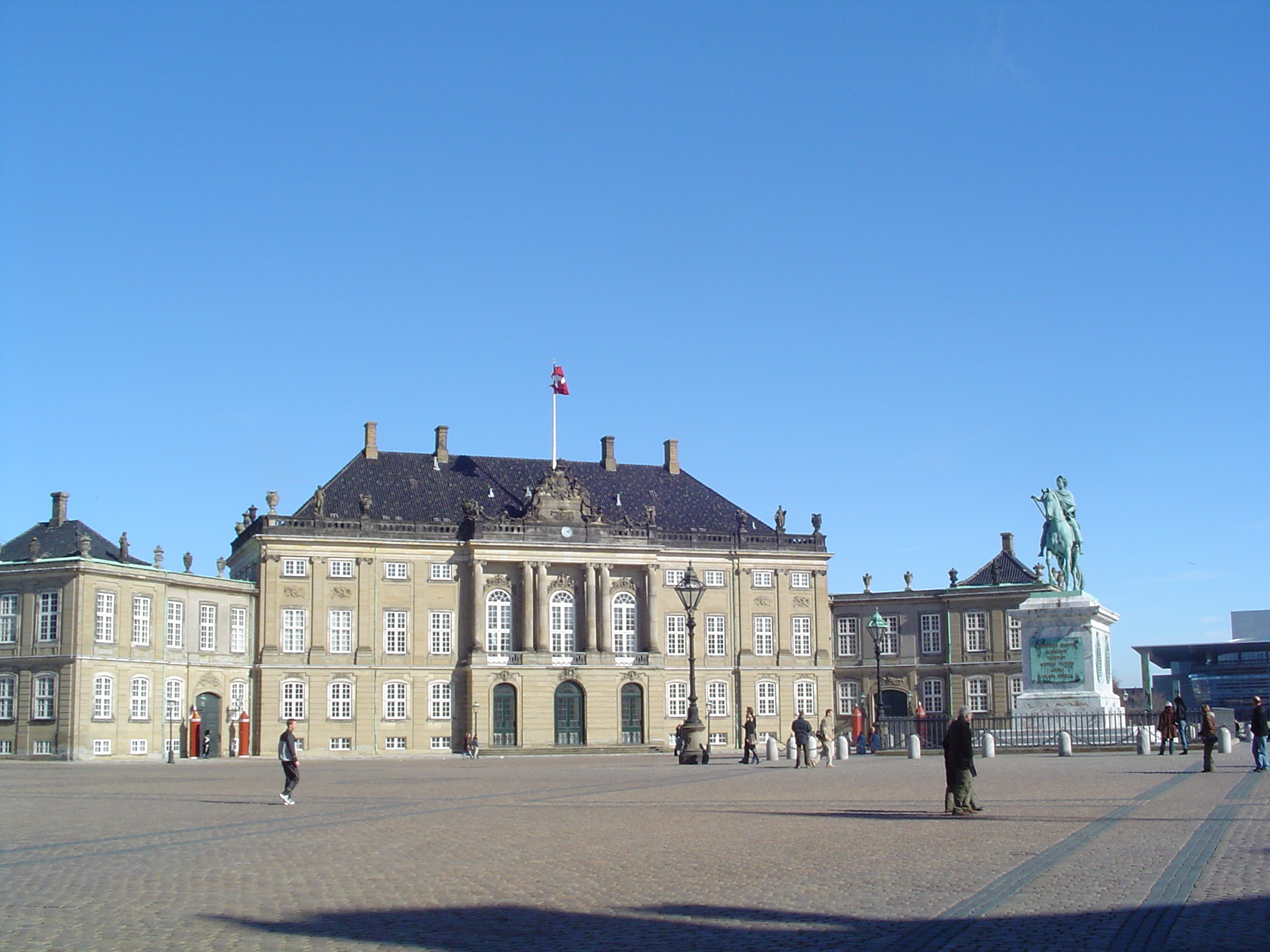
Brockdorff Palace, Copenhagen, built around 1750 by Baron Joachim von Brockdorff. In 1765 it was purchased by the Crown of Denmark

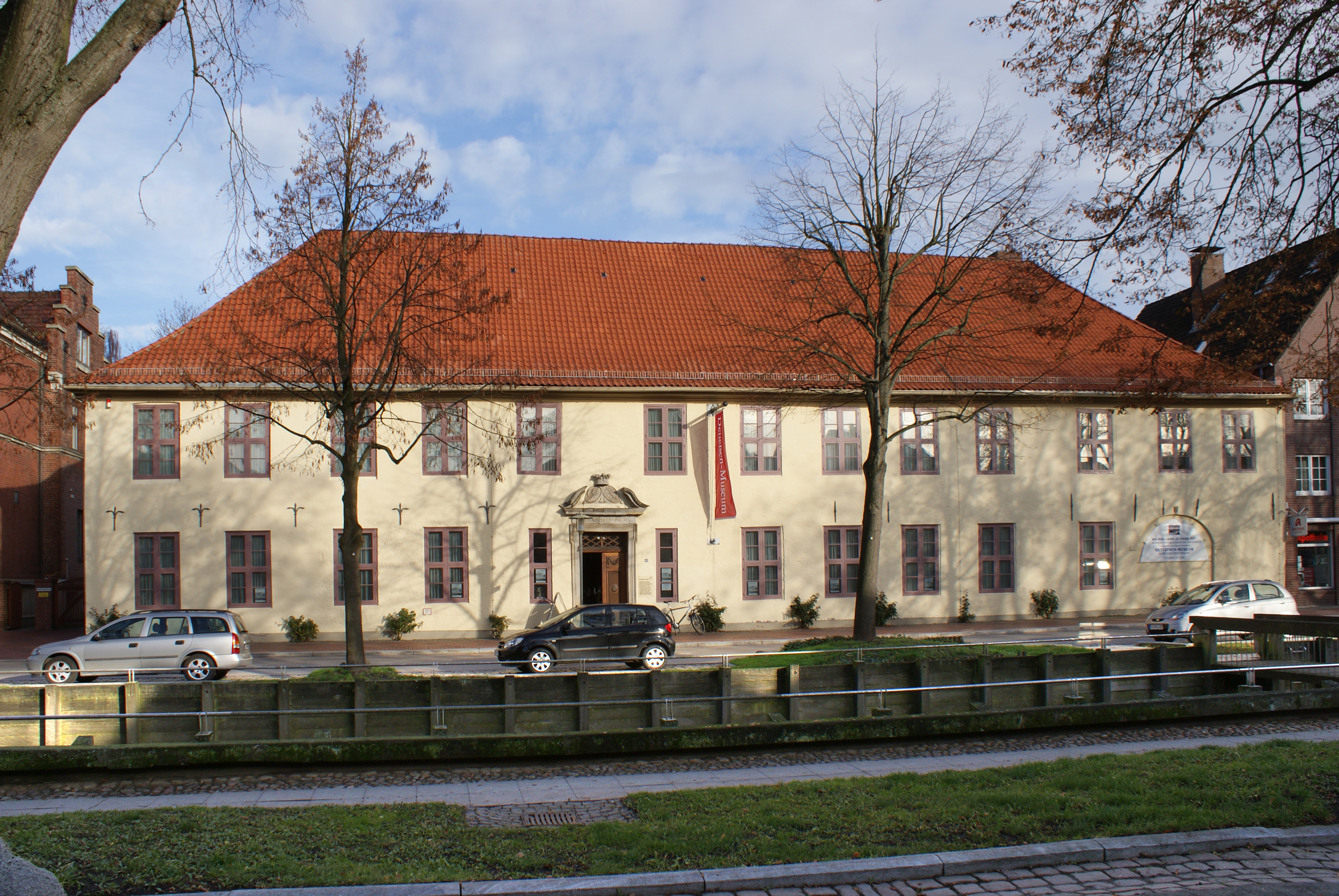
Brockdorff Palace in Glückstadt, Schleswig-Holstein, Germany

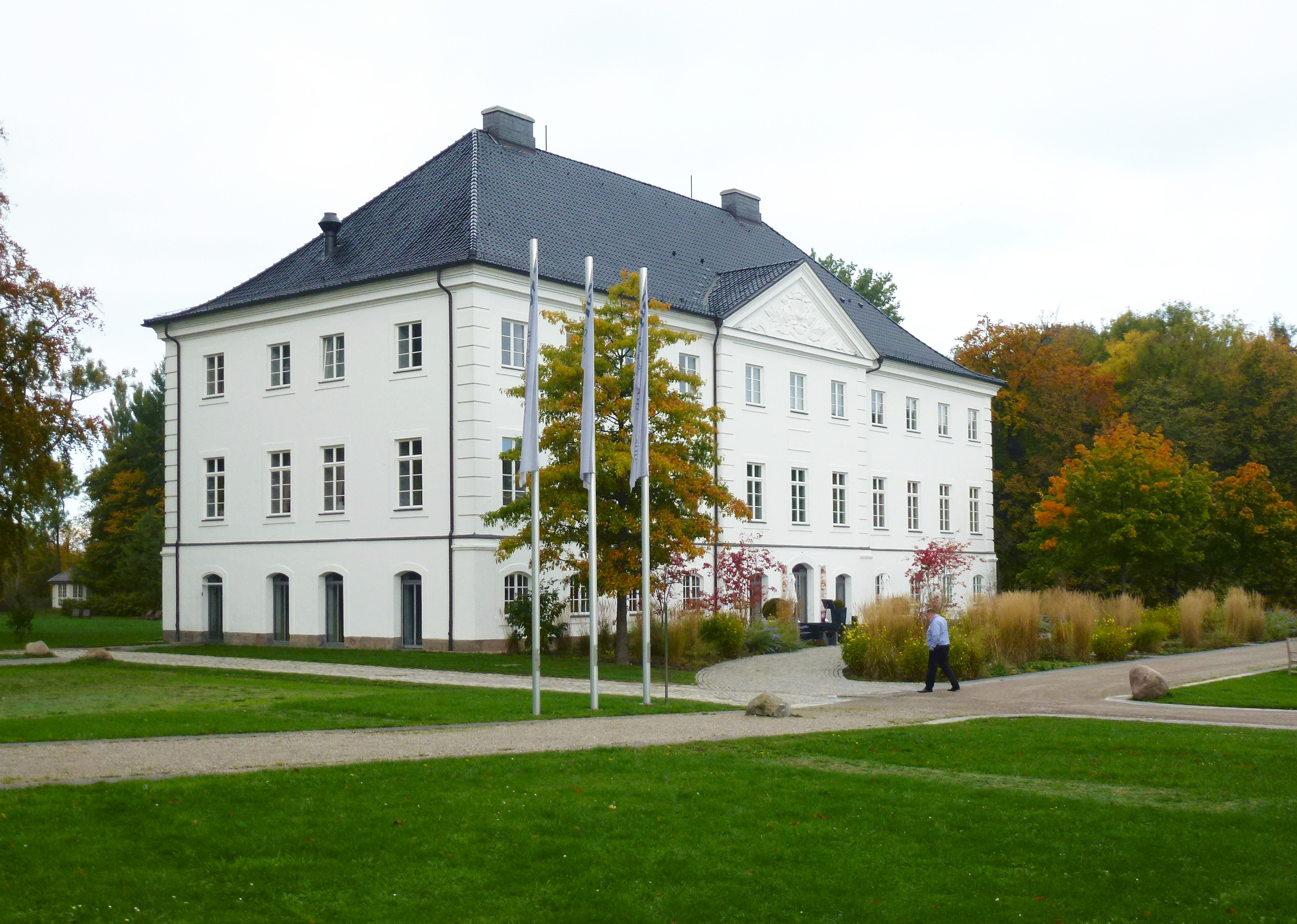
Castle Groß Schwansee, in Mecklenburg-Vorpommern, from 1780 until 1850 owned by Brockdorff family

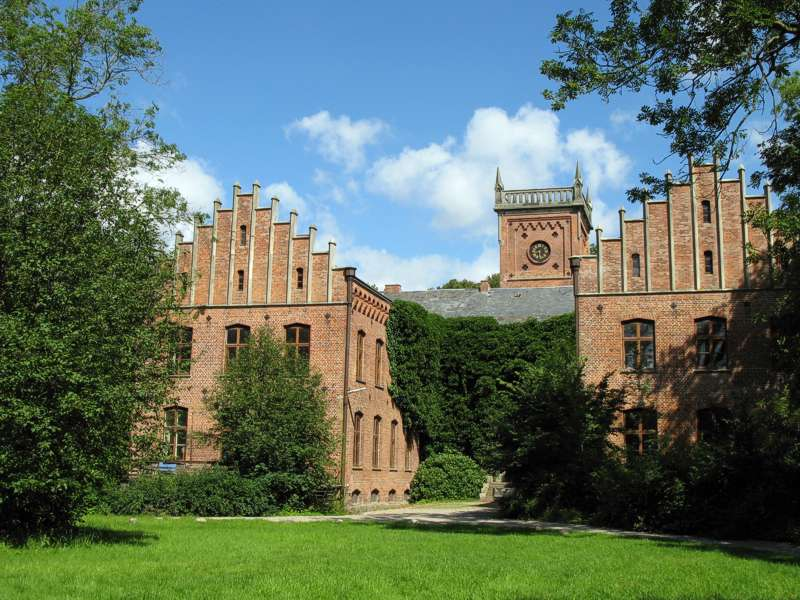
Castle Saxtorf, once owned by Brockdorff family

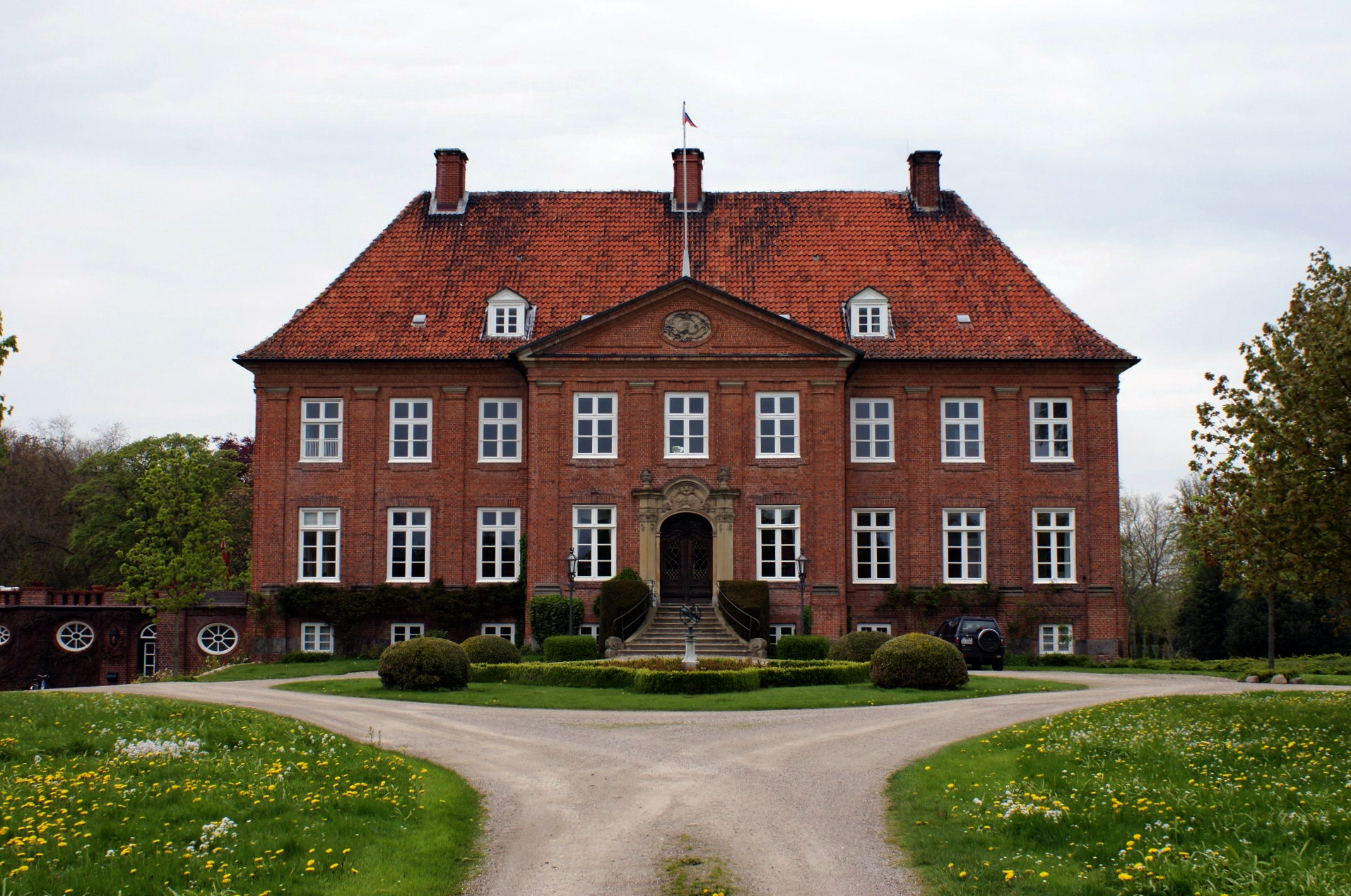
Castle Grünholz, owned by Brockdorff family until 1752

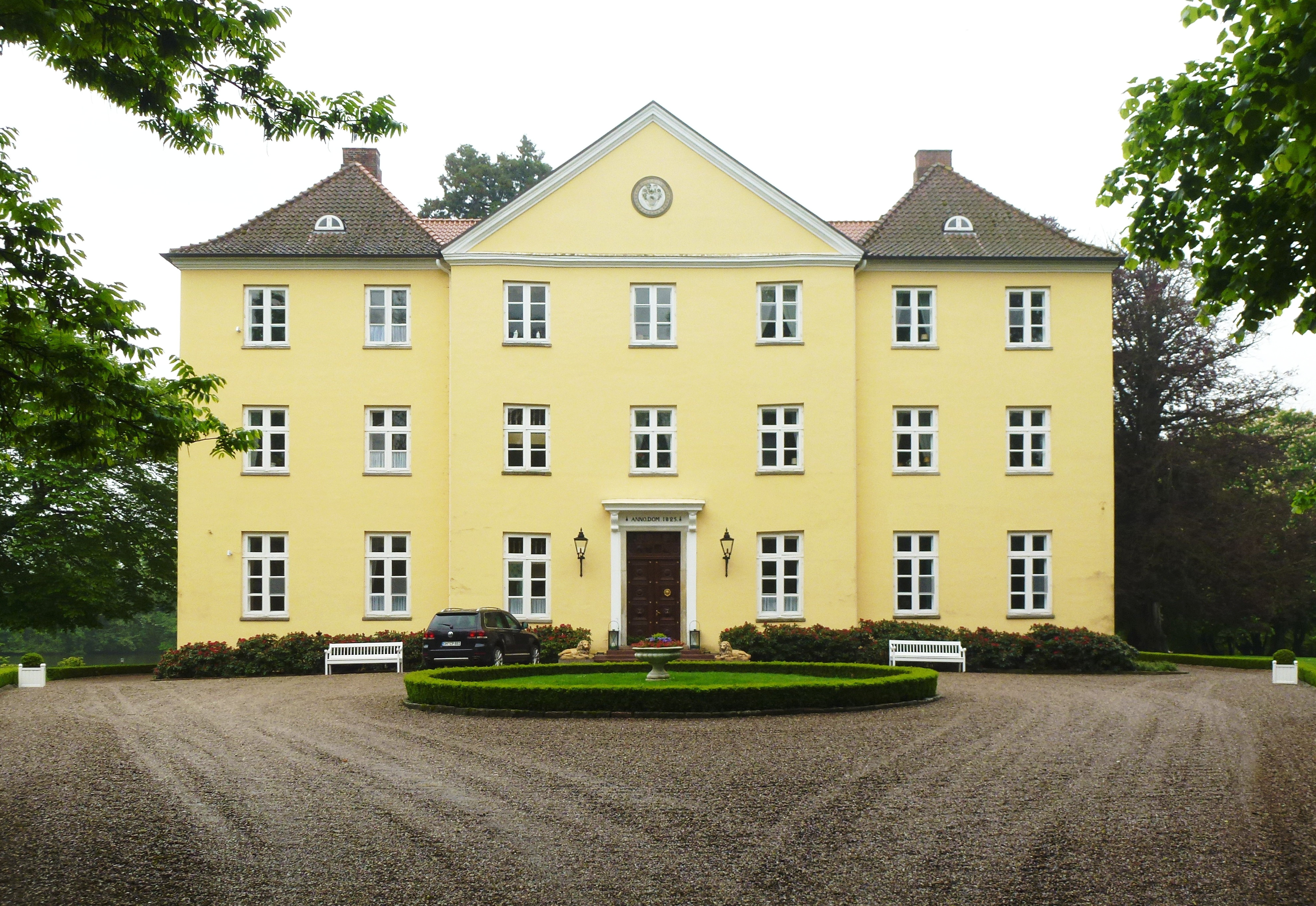
Castle Sierhagen, owned by Brockdorfff family from 1730 until 1752

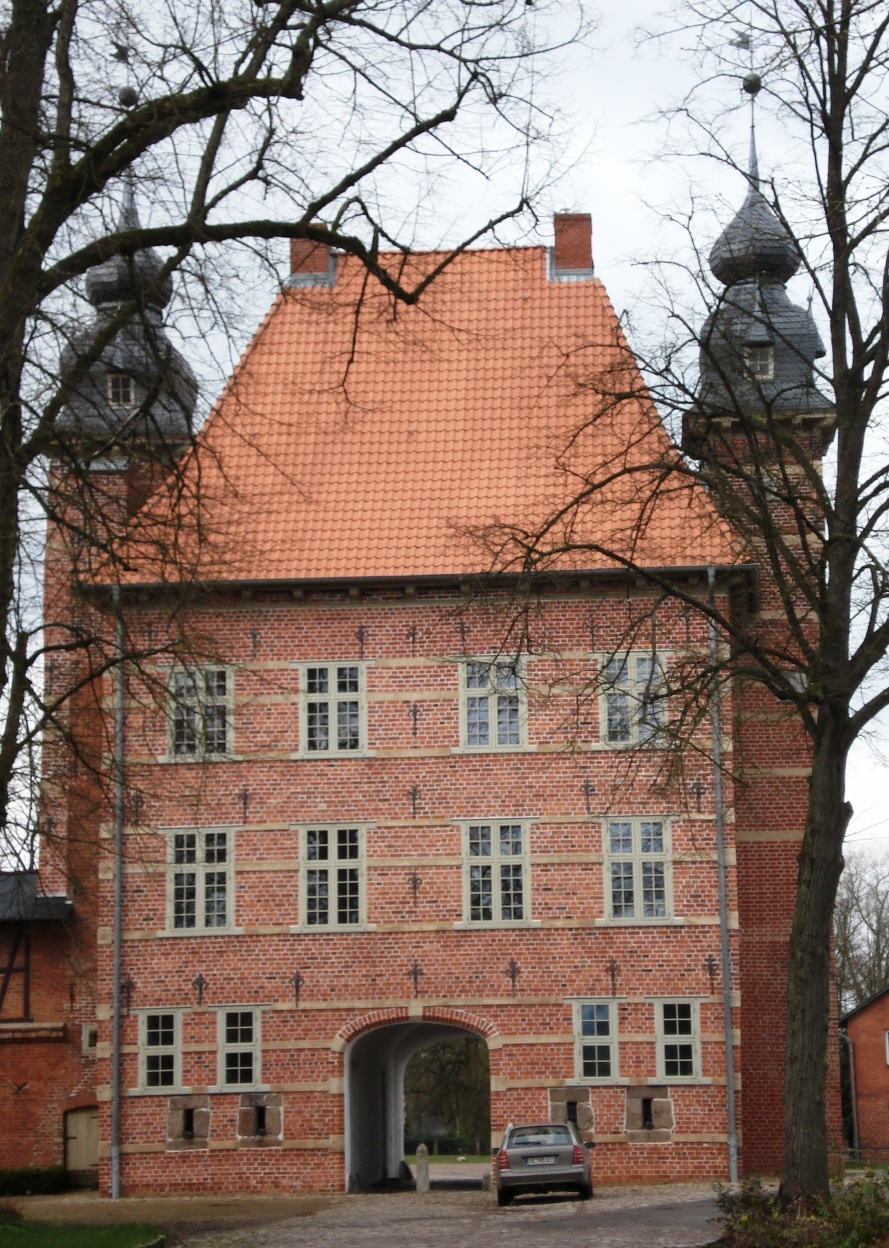
Tower Castle Seedorf, once owned by Brockdorff family

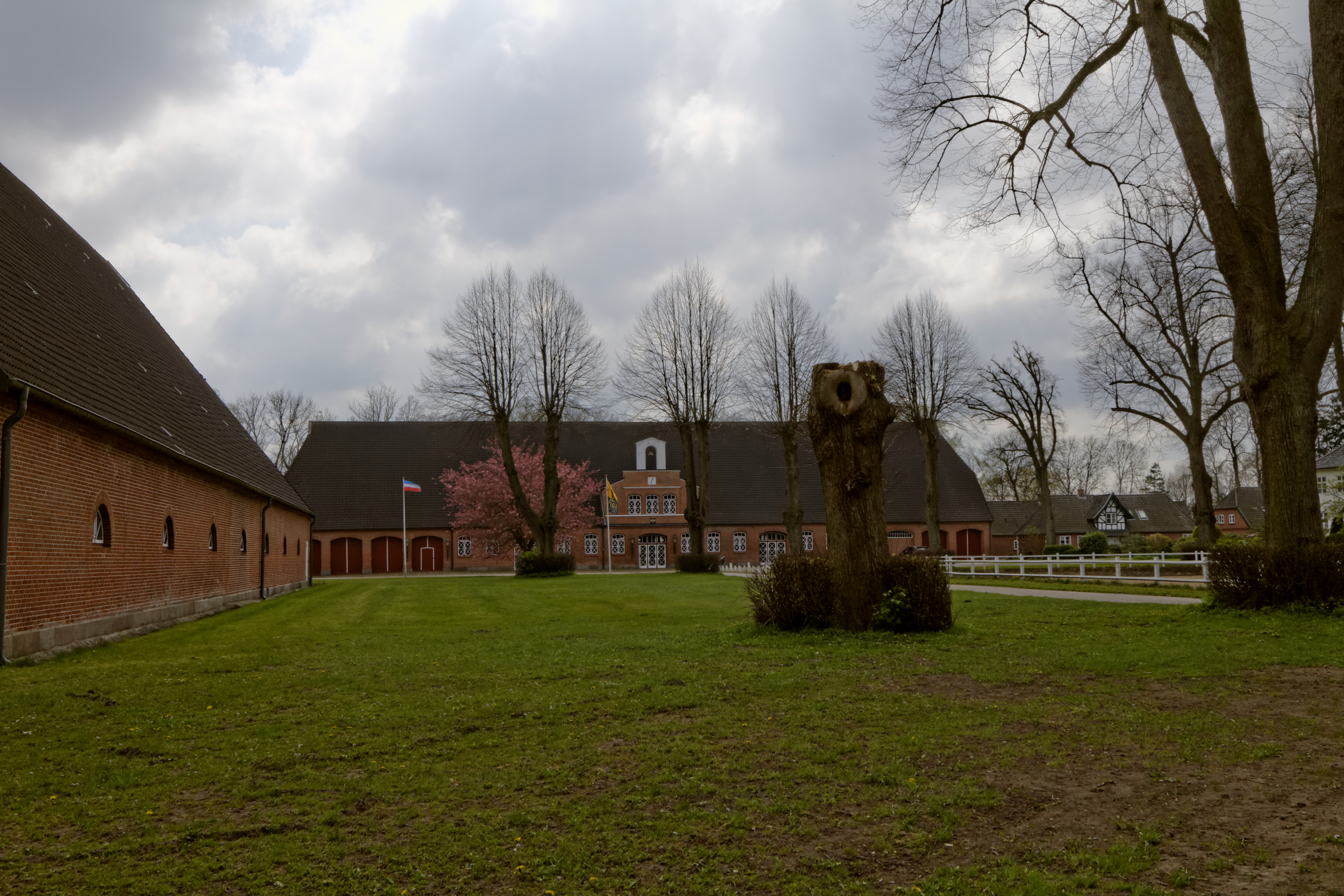
Osterrade estate, owned by Brockdorff family from 1723 until 1829

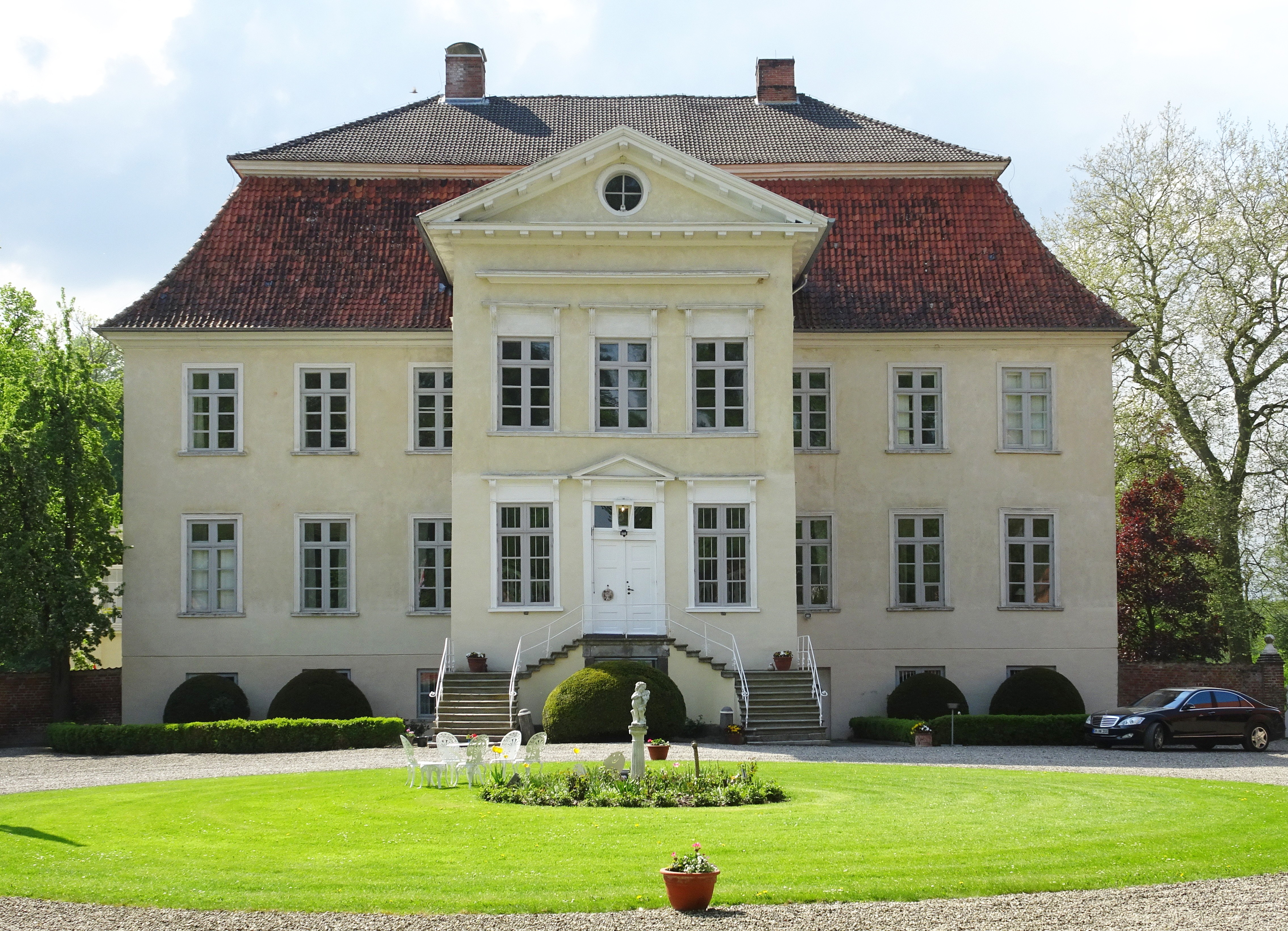
Castle Hasselburg, owned by Brockdorff family until 1752

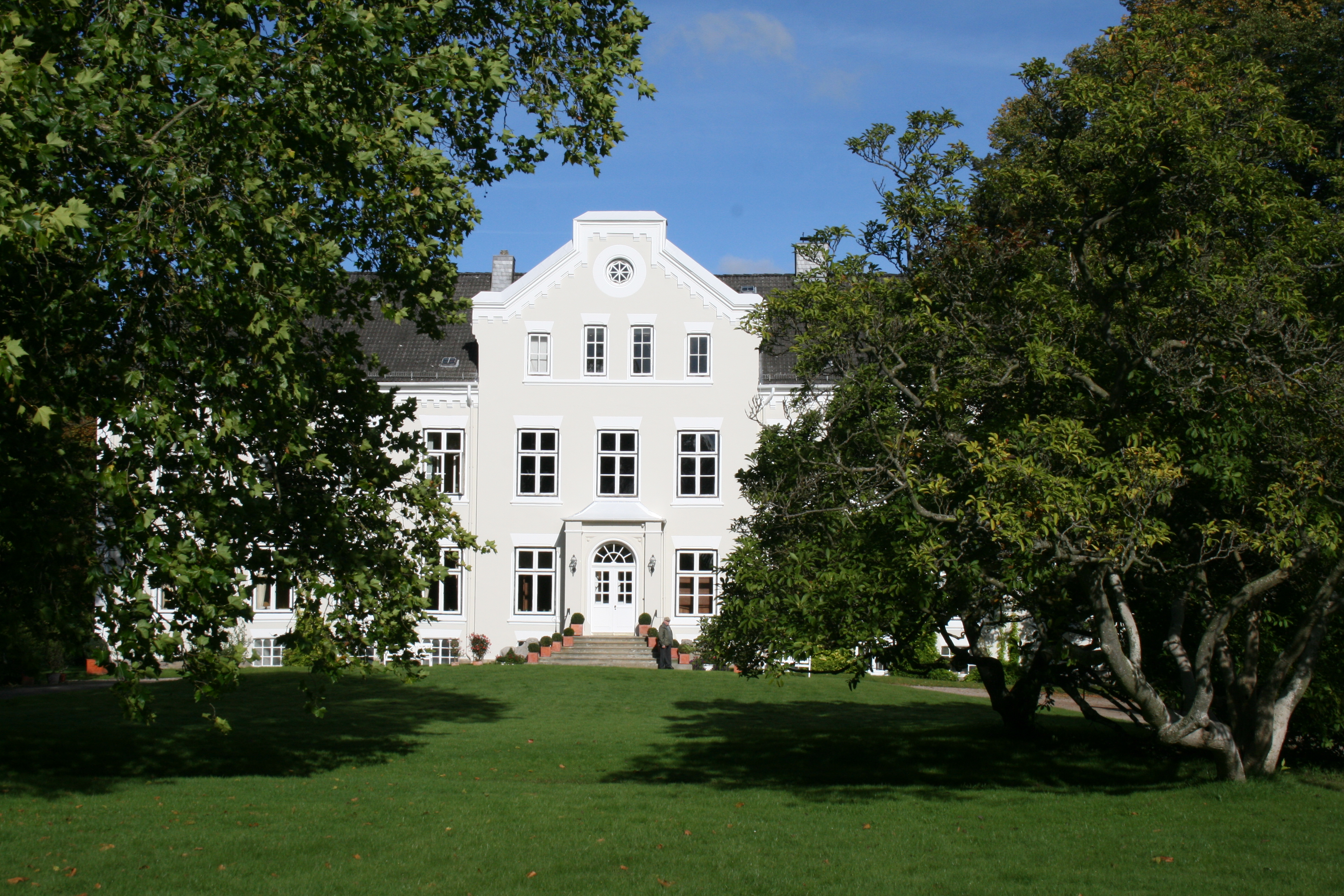
Bossee Castle, from 1587 until 1715 owned by Brockdorff family

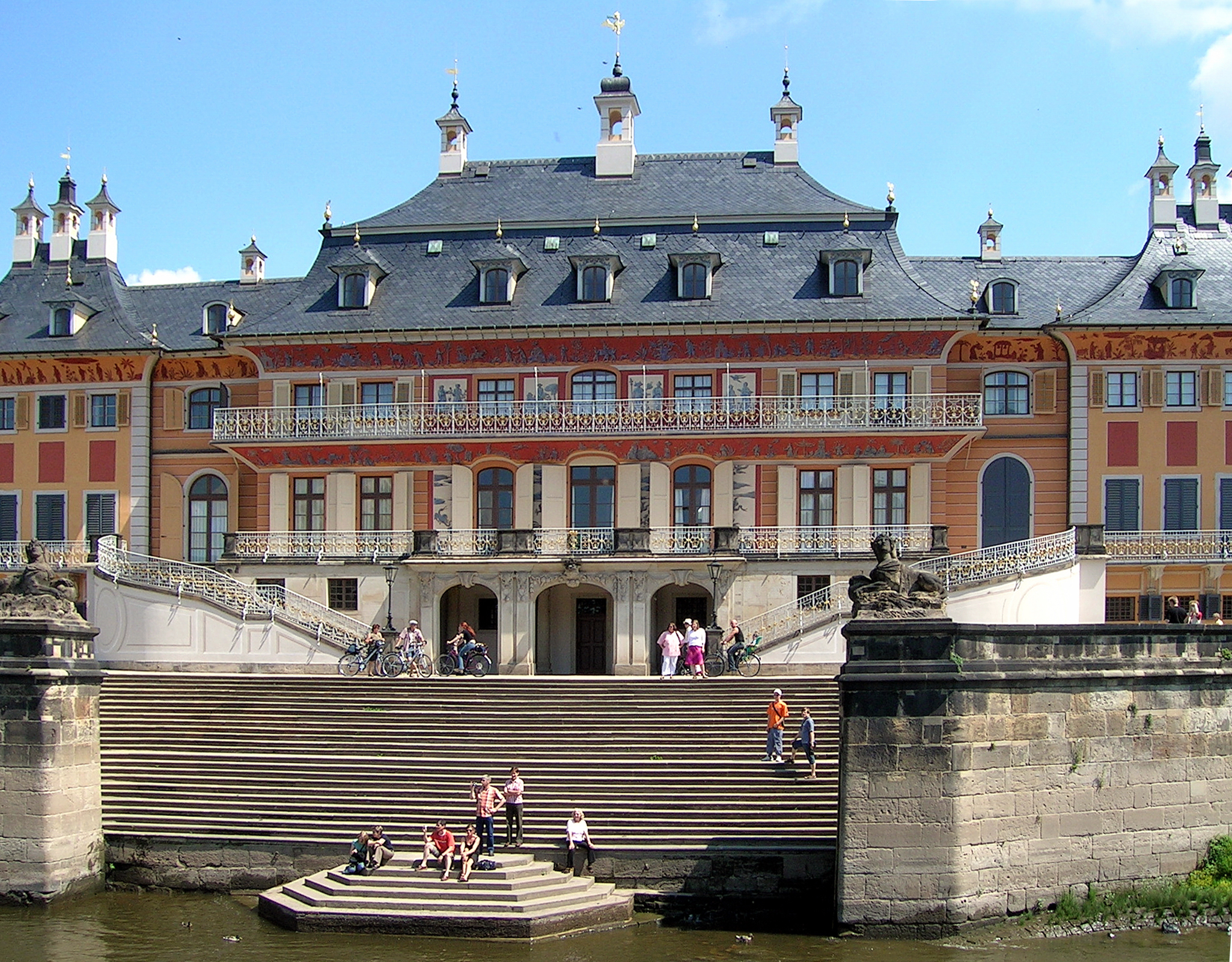
Castle Pillnitz von der Elbe, once owned by Anna Constantia von Brockdorff

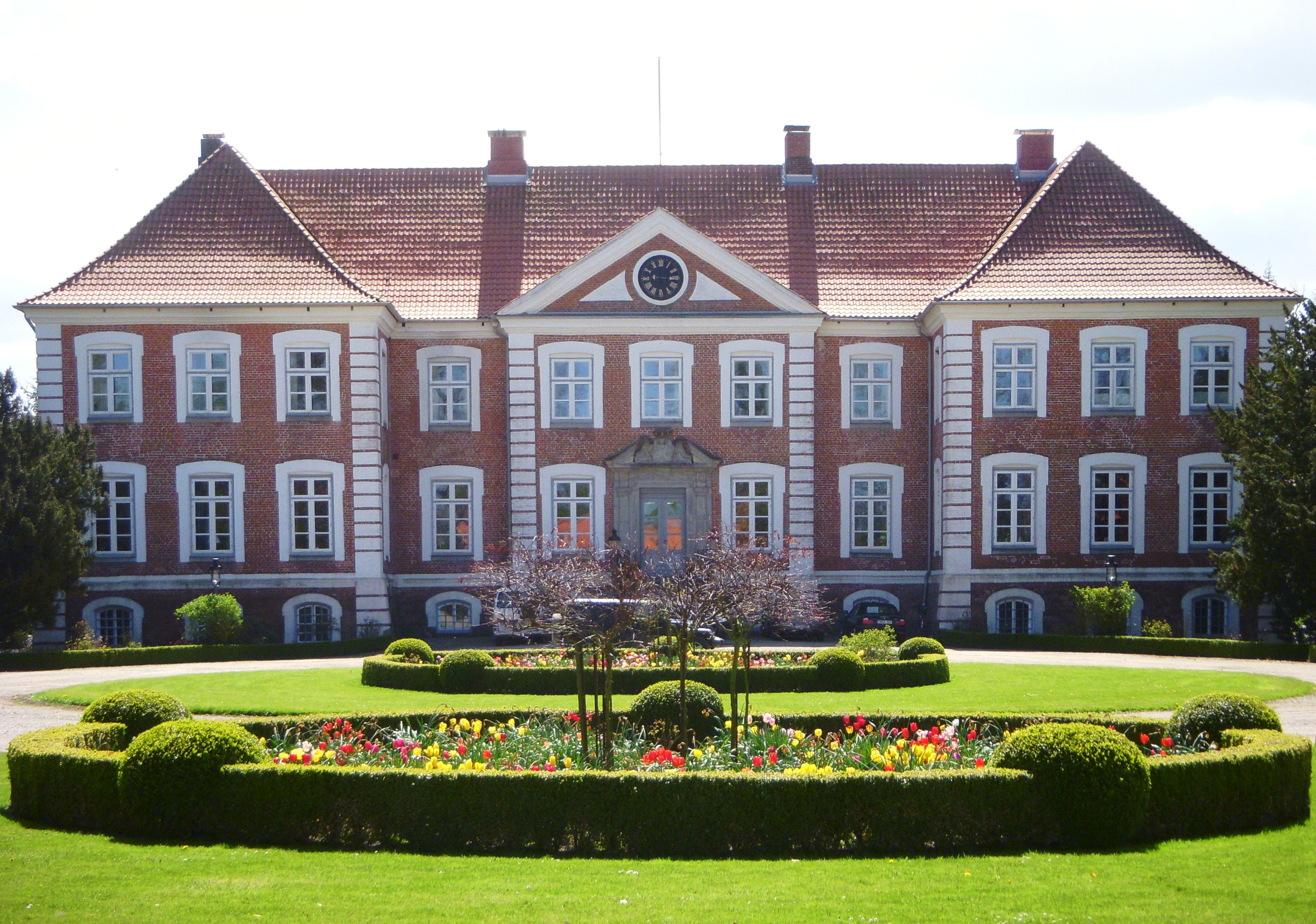
Castle Güldenstein, owned by Brockdorff family until 1752

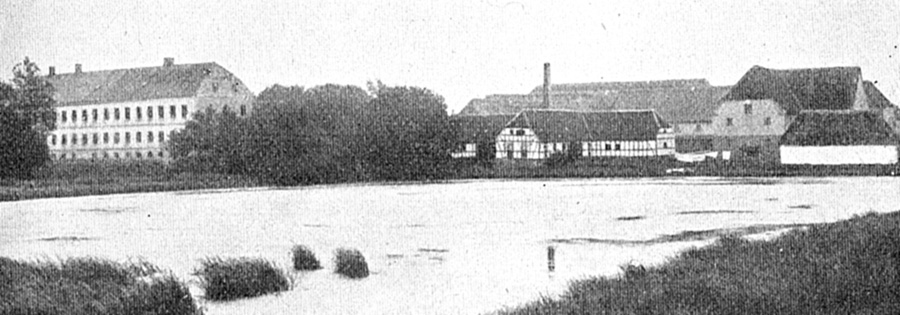
Scheelenborg estate, owned by Brockdorff-Scheelenborg line of the family

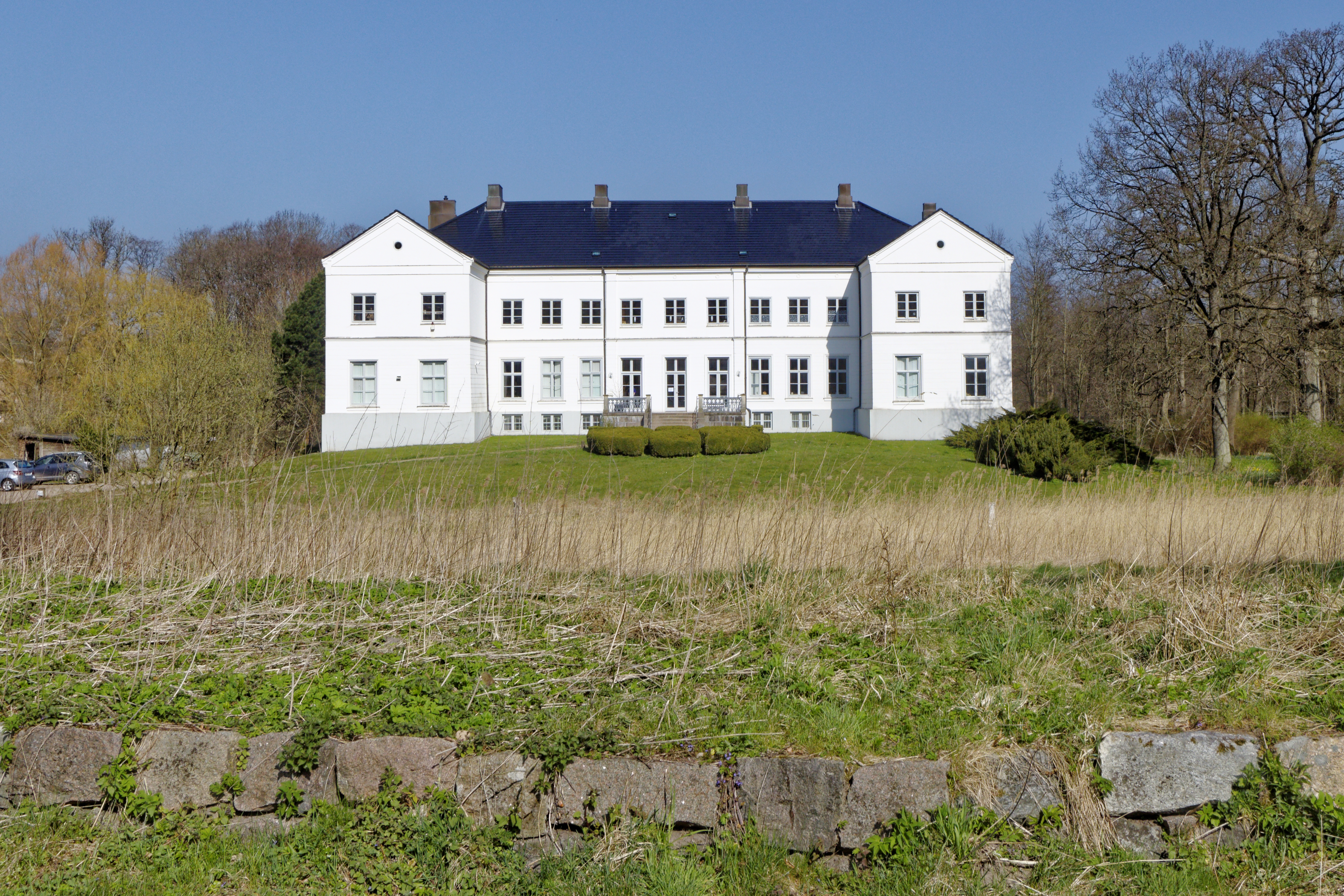
Windeby estate, once owned by Brockdorff family

== Notable people ==
- Joachim von Brockdorff (1643–1719), father of:
  - Anna Constantia von Brockdorff, Countess of Cosel, mistress of Augustus the Strong.
- Baron Joachim von Brockdorff, who built the Brockdorff's Palace
- Count Cay Lorenz von Brockdorff (1766–1840), Last Chancellor of Schleswig-Holstein and first High Court President of Schleswig-Holstein
  - Count Cay Lorenz von Brockdorff (1844–1921), grandson of above, German anthroposophist
    - Count Cay von Brockdorff, German Sculptor, himself a count, grandson of above, Erika's husband
    - Countess Erika von Brockdorff (1911–1943) German resistance fighter against the Nazi régime during World War II, herself a countess by marriage
- Count Charles Frederick von Brocktorff, (c.1775/85–1850) painter
- Count Walter von Brockdorff-Ahlefeldt, (1887–1943) German general in World War II
- Count Ulrich von Brockdorff-Rantzau, (1869–1928) German diplomat

== See also ==
- Brockdorff's Palace
