= Child Cancer Foundation =

Charity in New Zealand

The Child Cancer Foundation is a New Zealand-based charity that offers support to children with cancer and their families.

It has a high profile through public fundraising events.

As of 2011, it had an income of NZ$ 4.8 million, of which NZ$1.9 million was fundraising income, with most of the rest being from donations and bequests.

== See also ==
- Jane Skeen, Child Cancer Foundation board member
