= Rovshan Rzayev =

Azerbaijani soldier

- Born: October 15, 1969; Baku, Azerbaijan
- Died: January 8, 1999 (aged 29); Qobustan, Baku, Azerbaijan
- Military career
- Allegiance: Republic of Azerbaijan
- Service years: 1992-1999
- Conflicts: First Nagorno-Karabakh War
- Awards: National Hero of Azerbaijan; 1999

Rovshan Rzayev (Azerbaijani: Rövşən Abdulla oğlu Rzayev) (October 15, 1969, Baku, Azerbaijan – January 8, 1999, Qobustan, Baku, Azerbaijan) was an Azerbaijani officer, and National Hero of Azerbaijan.

== Early life ==
Rovshan Rzayev was born 15 October 1969 in Baku, Azerbaijan. He studied at the secondary school in Baku and later continued his education at the Higher Military School of Vladikavkaz, Russia. He voluntarily joined the ranks of Azerbaijani Armed Forces and frequently visited the front line.

== Military career ==
He was appointed the Commander of the regiment of the company. He killed dozens of Armenian soldiers in the battles around the villages of Pircamal, Aranzəmin, Şelli, Nakhichevanik and Papravənd in Agdam District. Although he suffered severe injuries during the battle in the Nakhichevanik village in 1992, he didn't leave alone his military personnel and saved the lives of many of the injured soldiers.

After completing his military service in Nagorno-Karabakh, Rovshan Rzayev was the commander of various military units at different times. Subsequently, he worked as a commander of the guard unit at the Gobustan high-security prison. On January 8, 1999, a riot took place in the security prison in which he was the commander of the guard unit at that time. The soldiers were taken hostage by a group of prisoners. Rovshan immediately went to the prison when he heard about this event. He reached the agreement with the prisoners that they were going to release the soldiers and Rovshan himself remained as a hostage. Rovshan Rzayev was killed by the prisoners while he was performing his duties.

== Personal life ==
Rovshan Rzayev was married and had two children.

== Honors ==
Rovshan Rzayev was posthumously awarded the title of "National Hero of Azerbaijan" by Presidential Decree No. 73 dated 12 January 1999. He was buried in Sahil settlement of Baku, Azerbaijan. There is a park named after Rovshan Rzayev Sahil settlement of Baku.

== See also ==
- First Nagorno-Karabakh War
- List of National Heroes of Azerbaijan

== Sources ==
- Vugar Asgarov. Azərbaycanın Milli Qəhrəmanları (Yenidən işlənmiş II nəşr). Bakı: "Dərələyəz-M", 2010, səh. 250.
