= Tom Chantiles =

American football player (1916–1999)

- Tom Chantiles, 1944

Profile
- Position: Tackle

Personal information
- Born: July 2, 1916; York, Pennsylvania, U.S.
- Died: January 19, 1999 (aged 82); Mission Viejo, California, U.S.
- Listed height: 6 ft 0 in (1.83 m)
- Listed weight: 220 lb (100 kg)

Career information
- College: USC

Career history
- Detroit Lions (1942)

Career NFL statistics
- Games played: 2
- Stats at Pro Football Reference

Thomas James Chantiles (July 2, 1916 – January 19, 1999) was an American football player.

== Early life ==
Chantiles was born in 1916 in York, Pennsylvania. He attended William Penn High School where he was a star athlete in football and wrestling.

Chantiles began his college education at Temple and Fullerton Junior College. While at Fullerton, he played for the football team and was a contender for the Pacific Coast heavyweight wrestling championship. In the fall of 1939, he enrolled at the University of Southern California. He graduated from USC in June 1942 with a Bachelor of Science degree in physical education.

== Professional football ==
He played professional football in the National Football League (NFL) as a tackle for the Detroit Lions. He appeared in two NFL games for the Lions during the 1942 season. He was traded by the Lions to the Chicago Cardinals in October 1942. He was released by the Cardinals a week later.

== Later life ==
During World War II, Chantiles served as a staff sergeant in the Army's medical corps in Virginia.

He later worked as a teacher and coach in York. He retired in 1979 and moved to California. He died in 1999 in Mission Viejo, California.
