= Jane Skeen =

New Zealand cancer researcher

Jane Skeen MNZM
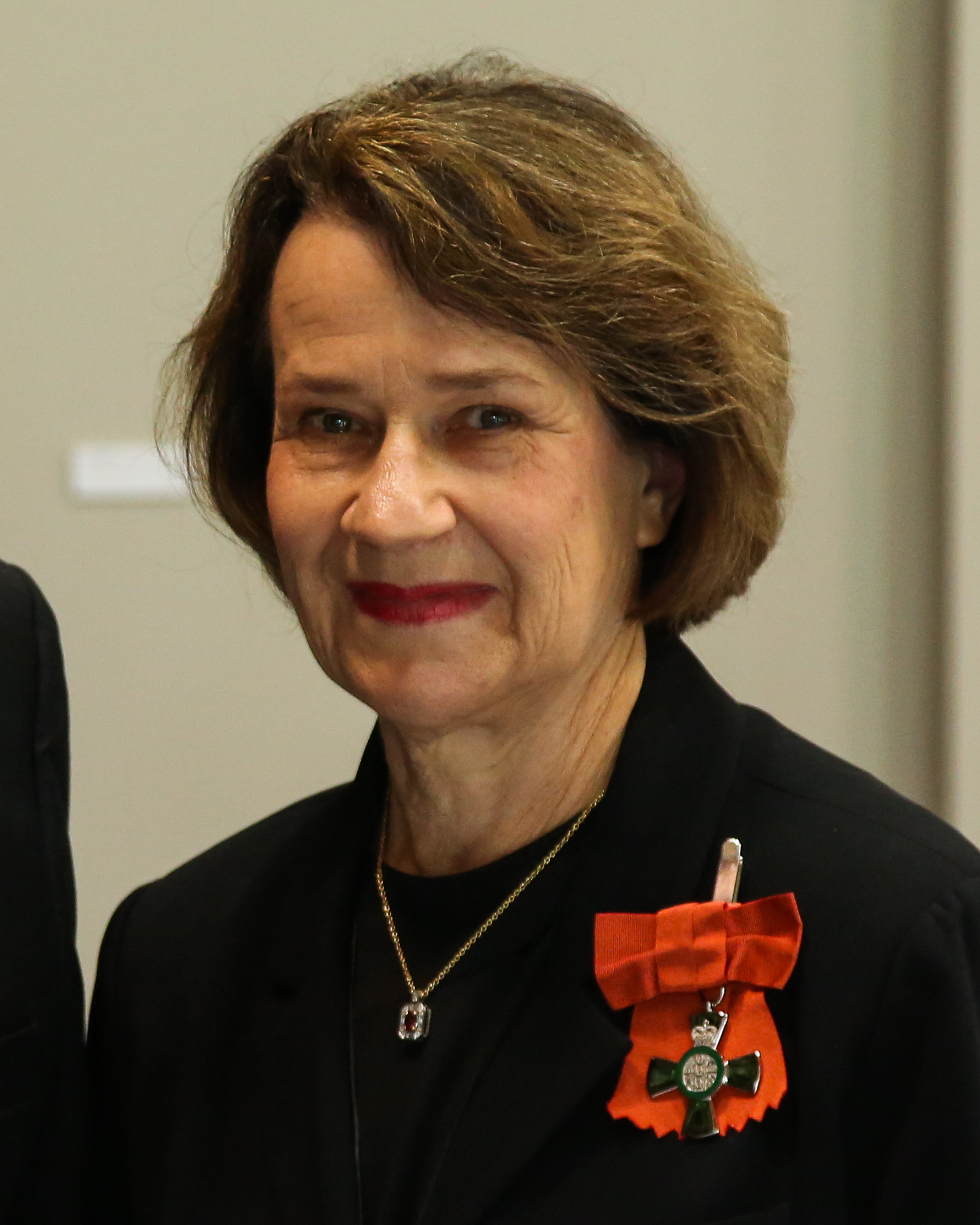
- Skeen in 2023
- Education: University of Auckland
- Scientific career
- Fields: Paediatric oncology
- Workplaces: Starship Children's Hospital

Jane Elizabeth Skeen MNZM is a New Zealand paediatric oncologist who worked at Starship Blood and Cancer Centre at Starship Children's Hospital in Auckland. In 2023, Skeen was appointed a Member of the New Zealand Order of Merit, for services to children with cancer. She is an honorary life member of the Child Cancer Foundation, and a life member of the Australia and New Zealand Children's Haematology and Oncology Group.

== Academic career ==
Skeen qualified in medicine at the University of Auckland, and specialised in paediatric oncology from 1979. She was appointed to a position as paediatric oncologist in 1981, and retired in 2022.

Skeen was the health professional representative on the Child Cancer Foundation Board for 33 years. During her career, child cancer survival rates increased such that research was needed into late effects of child cancer treatment. Skeen was also involved in the establishment of child palliative care as a discipline, and taught in a teaching programme to improve paediatric palliative care.

Skeen was Chair of the National Child Cancer Network Pacific Child Cancer working group, which was established in 2007 to try to address poor survival rates for child cancer in the region due to treatment availability. Skeen led annual visits of a team from Starship Hospital to Tonga, Samoa and Vanuatu.

== Honours and awards ==
In the 2023 New Year Honours, Skeen was appointed a Member of the New Zealand Order of Merit for services to children with cancer.

In 2001 Skeen was awarded an Honorary Life Membership for the Child Cancer Foundation.

Skeen was awarded life membership of the Australia and New Zealand Children's Haematology and Oncology Group, for providing "exceptional oncology care" and for her "pioneering role in the development and achievements of the Pacific Working Group".

== Selected works ==
- Ogawa O; Becroft DM; Ian Morison; Eccles MR; Skeen JE; Mauger DC; Reeve AE (1 December 1993). "Constitutional relaxation of insulin-like growth factor II gene imprinting associated with Wilms' tumour and gigantism". Nature Genetics. 5 (4): 408–412. doi:10.1038/ng1293-408. ISSN 1061-4036. PMID 8298652. Wikidata Q24337027.
- Wenliang Li; Patricia Kessler; Herman Yeger; Jennifer Alami; Anthony E Reeve; Rosemary Heathcott; Jane Skeen; Bryan R G Williams (1 April 2005). "A gene expression signature for relapse of primary wilms tumors". Cancer Research. 65 (7): 2592–2601. doi:10.1158/0008-5472.can-04-1532. ISSN 0008-5472. PMID 15805255. Wikidata Q38328550.
- Penelope R Brock; Rudolf Maibach; Margaret Childs; et al. (1 June 2018). "Sodium Thiosulfate for Protection from Cisplatin-Induced Hearing Loss". The New England Journal of Medicine. 378 (25): 2376–2385. doi:10.1056/nejmoa1801109. ISSN 0028-4793. PMC 6117111. PMID 29924955. Wikidata Q55951903.
- Rapley EA; Barfoot R; Bonaïti-Pellié C; et al. (1 July 2000). "Evidence for susceptibility genes to familial Wilms tumour in addition to WT1, FWT1 and FWT2". British Journal of Cancer. 83 (2): 177–183. doi:10.1054/bjoc.2000.1283. ISSN 0007-0920. PMC 2363495. PMID 10901367. Wikidata Q36621758.
- Benjamin J Halliday; Ryuji Fukuzawa; David Markie; et al. (18 June 2018). "Germline mutations and somatic inactivation of TRIM28 in Wilms tumour". PLOS Genetics. 14 (6) e1007399. doi:10.1371/journal.pgen.1007399. ISSN 1553-7390. PMC 6005459. PMID 29912901. Wikidata Q55262812.
- Chamberlain JD; Smibert E; Skeen J; Alvaro F (1 November 2005). "Prospective audit of treatment of paediatric febrile neutropenia in Australasia". Journal of Paediatrics and Child Health. 41 (11): 598–603. doi:10.1111/j.1440-1754.2005.00729.x. ISSN 1034-4810. PMID 16398846. Wikidata Q40489254.
