= István Molnár (volleyball) =

Hungarian volleyball player (1937–1999)

Personal information
- Nationality: Hungarian
- Born: 9 October 1937; Debrecen, Hungary
- Died: 29 January 1999 (aged 61)

Sport
- Sport: Volleyball

István Molnár (9 October 1937 – 29 January 1999) was a Hungarian volleyball player. He competed in the men's tournament at the 1964 Summer Olympics.
