= W. L. H. Skeen =

English photographer (1847–1903)

William Skeen
- Born: William Louis Henry Skeen; 1 July 1847; London
- Died: 26 January 1903 (aged 55); British Ceylon
- Education: London School of Photography
- Known for: Photography

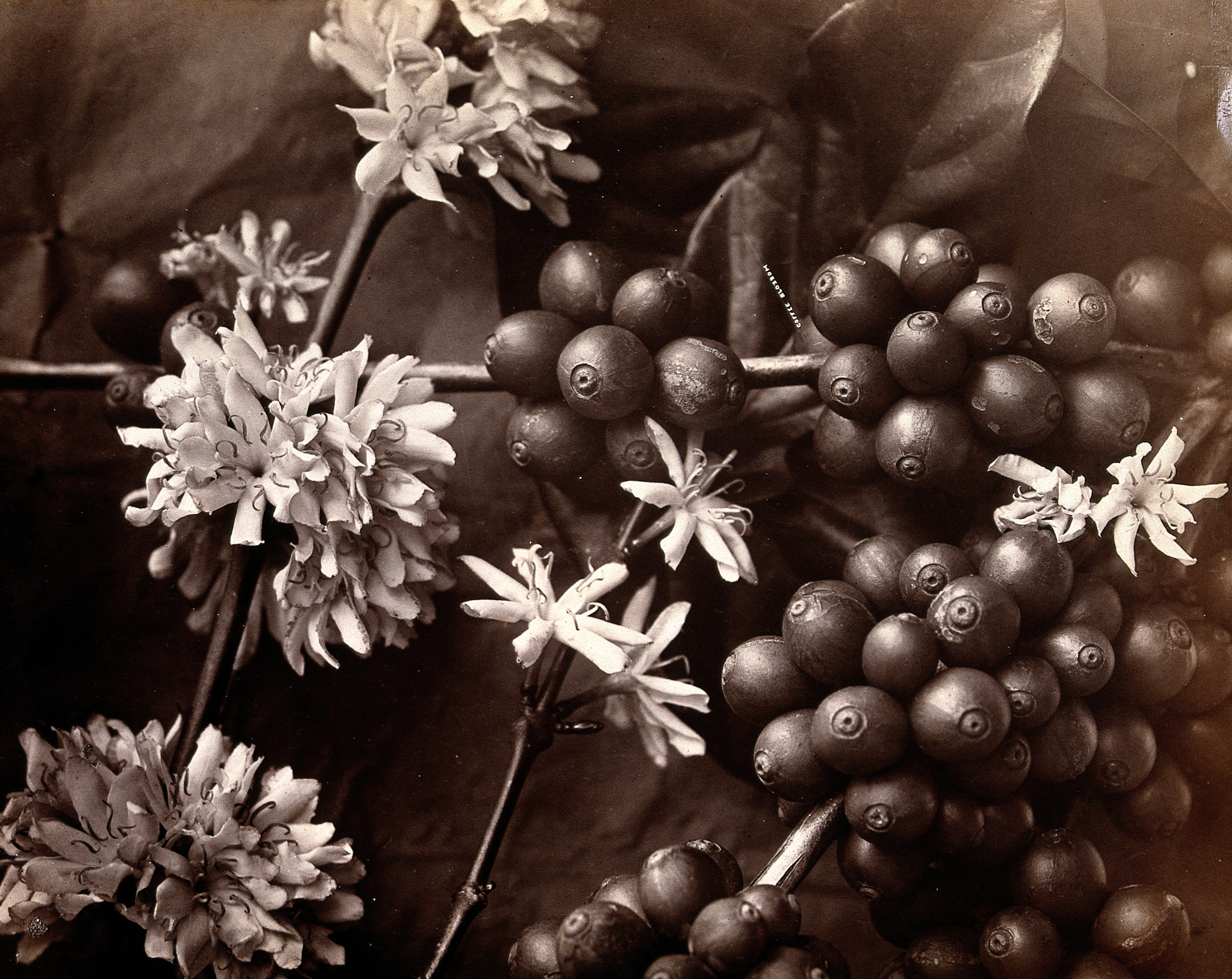
Blossoms and fruit of a coffee, Coffea arabica

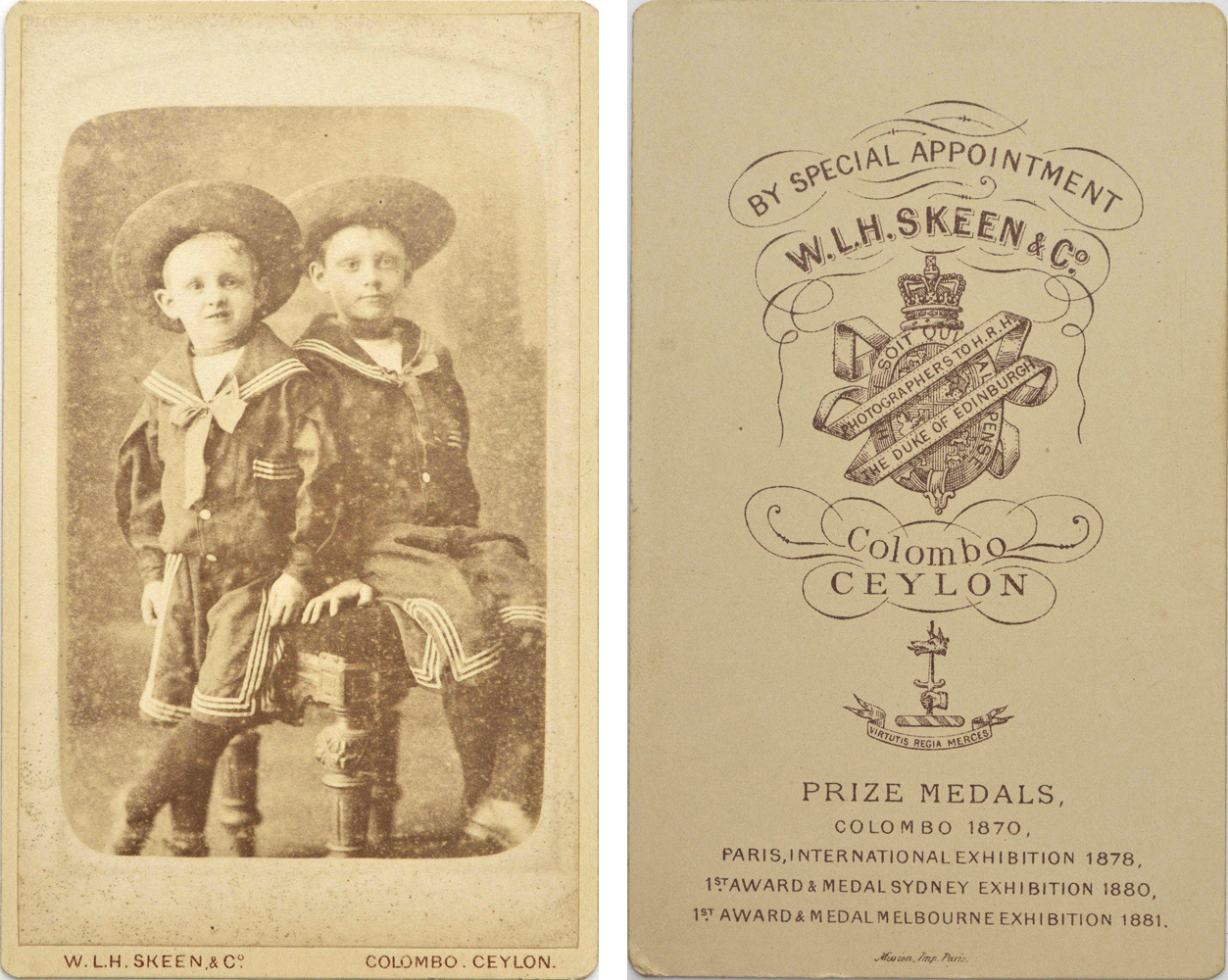
Portrait of two boys

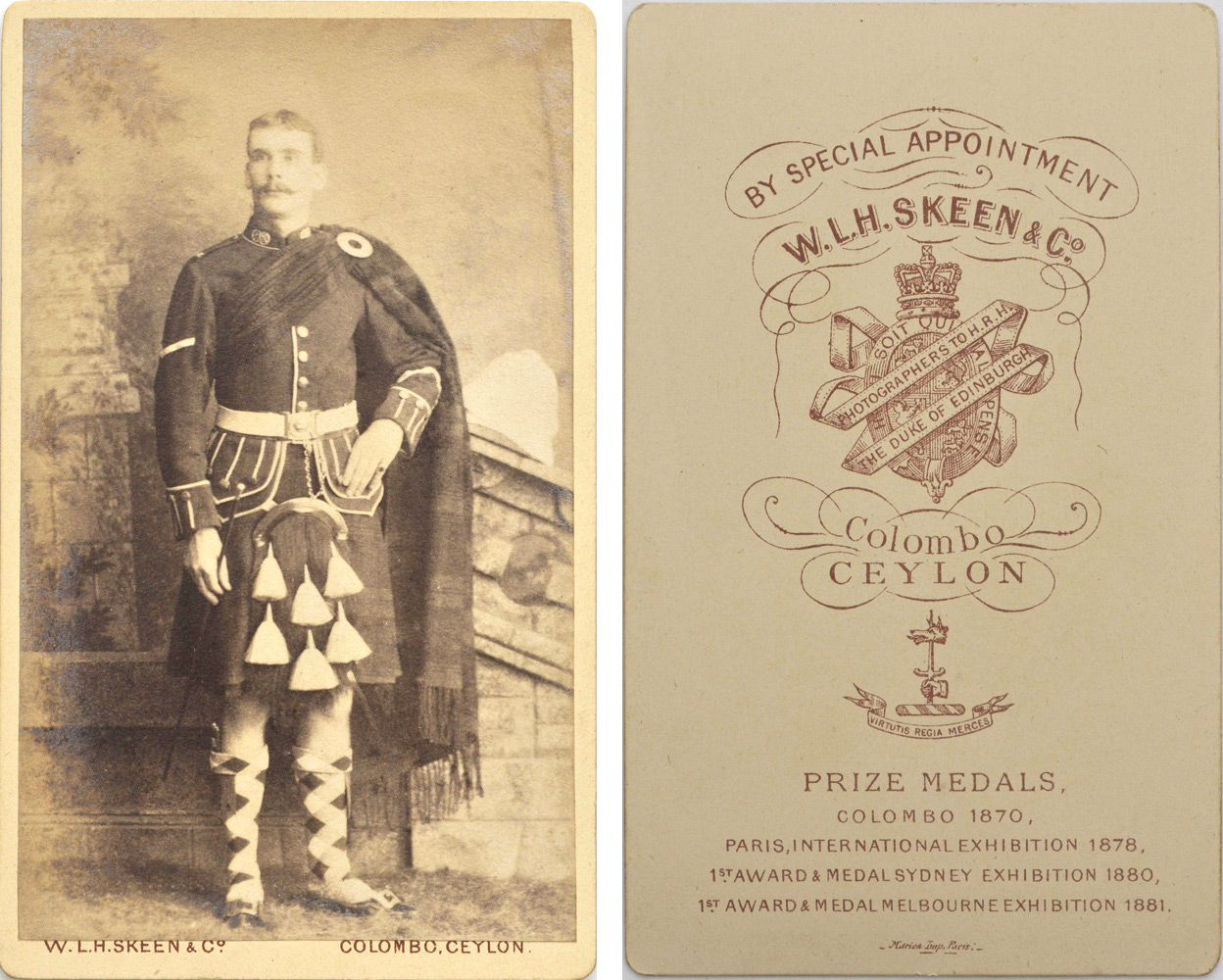
Scottish soldier

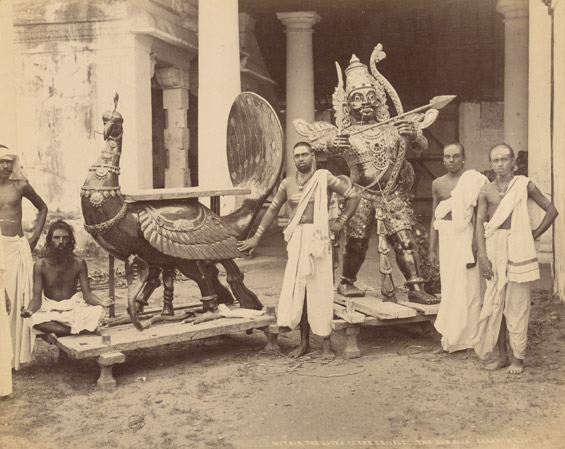
Brahmins, a fakir and figures of a peacock and the god Siva

William Louis Henry Skeen (1847–1903) was an English photographer in Ceylon (now Sri Lanka) who photographed tea and coffee cultivation, railway construction, landscapes and various inhabitants in the second half of the 19th century.

William Louis Henry Skeen was born 1 July 1847 in London, his father, William Skeen Sr. (1822–1872), was the first officially appointed Government Printer for Ceylon (1849–1872) and his mother was Louisa Matilda née Kemp (1822–1864). In 1860 Skeen Sr purchased the photographic studio of James Parting in Colombo. The studio operated firstly as S. Slinn & Co and was managed by Samuel Slinn Skeen (the younger brother of Skeen Sr) and John Edward Wilshaw. Skeen Jr who was trained at the London School of Photography returned to Colombo in 1862, taking over control of the photographic studio, renaming it W.L.H. Skeen & Co. in 1868.

Skeen's younger brothers, George Justin Athelstan (1852–1906) was the Ceylon Government Printer (1881–1906) and Frederick Albert Edward (1861–1929) assisted his brother at W.L.H. Skeen & Co until 1887, when he went to Burma (now Myanmar) establishing the photographic firm of Watts and Skeen in Rangoon. Frederick returned to Ceylon after the death of William in 1903 and changed the company name to F. Skeen and Co.. Frederick left Ceylon in 1914 and the studio closed in the early 1920s.

The photo company was appointed to work for the Duke of Edinburgh during his 1870 tour. Among the photographic subject the captured were elephant kraals.

Skeen Jr.'s illustrations were used for two books that his father wrote: The Knuckles and Other Poems (1868) and Adam's Peak (1870). The studio also published J.W.W. Birch's photographs of Polonnaruwa as well as views of Indian cities. A branch studio was also opened in Kandy, Ceylon (now Sri Lanka) in 1891.

== Personal life ==
Skeen was married to Elizabeth, who ran a millinery in Kandy. They had had three children: Ellen Margaret, Sydney Louis Ernest, and Harold Lewis Spencer. His wife died on 20 January 1933 at Clacton-on-Sea.
