= Cay von Brockdorff =

German sculptor and art historian

- Born: Cay-Hugo von Brockdorff; 9 February 1915; Schmargendorf (Berlin) Germany
- Died: 17 January 1999 (aged 83)
- Occupations: Sculptor political activist arts administrator
- Political party: KPD; SAP; SED
- Spouse(s): 1. Erika Schönfeldt (1911-1943); 2. Eva Rutkowski-Lippold (1909-1970)
- Children: 1
- Parent(s): Ludwig von Brockdorff (1881-1938); Erika von Spalding (1892–1940)

Cay-Hugo Graf von Brockdorff, known as Cay von Brockdorff (9 February 1915 - 17 January 1999) was a German sculptor and art historian who after 1933 became an anti-Nazi resistance activist.

== Life ==
Cay-Hugo Graf von Brockdorff (Cay-Hugo, the Count of Brockdorff) was born in the Berlin quarter of Schmargendorf. He was the son of Count Ludwig von Brockdorff (1881-1938), a district judge and his wife Erika Hildegard Therese Martha von Spalding (1892-1940). His grandfather, Count Cay Lorenz von Brockdorff (1844–1921), had been a cavalry officer and a theosophist-anthroposophist.

He studied at the United National Academy for Free and Applied Arts ("Vereinigte Staatsschulen für freie und angewandte Kunst") in Berlin-Charlottenburg where he was taught by the sculptor Wilhelm Gerstel. After that he launched himself as a freelance visual artist. Through his studies he made contacts with people who would later become opposition activists in the Charlottenburg district, and members of the group around Kurt Schumacher who would be arrested by the Gestapo in 1942.

Around or before 1931, von Brockdorff became a member of the Communist Party and of the Socialist Workers' Party ("Sozialistische Arbeiterpartei Deutschlands" / SAP). In January 1933 the Nazis took power and lost no time in transforming Germany into a one-party dictatorship. Political activism (except in support of the Nazi party) became illegal. Sources nevertheless indicate that from 1936 he was involved in "illegal work" in various groups of "intellectuals" and "workers".

In 1937, he married Erika Schönfeldt (1911-1943). Their daughter Saskia was born towards the end of October 1937. In 1939 he linked up with Hans Coppi who around this time became a member of the so-called Rote Kapelle (inaccurately but conventionally translated into English as "Red Orchestra") resistance group. Erika von Brockdorff would later put her Berlin apartment at the disposal of Coppi for use as a radio communication centre, connecting with Moscow, as a result of which she was arrested and, on 13 May 1943, executed. Meanwhile, war having broken out in September 1939, Cay von Brockdorff found himself serving in the army between July and October 1940, and again between April 1941 and October 1942.

In 1942, while serving on the Russian Front, von Brockdorff was arrested because of his involvement in the Red Orchestra group. He was found guilty of "preparing to commit high treason" and sentenced to a four year prison term before being transferred to serve in a punishment battalion. The time-lines are not entirely clear, but it does appear he never had the chance to communicate with his wife before she died, although a short moving letter of valediction that she wrote to him shortly before her execution does survive. Between 1943 and November 1946 Cay von Brockdorff was held by the British military authorities as a prisoner of war in Italy.

After May 1945 the central portion of Germany surrounding Berlin was administered as the Soviet occupation zone, and it was to the Soviet zone that Brockdorff returned. April 1946 saw the contentious political merger that created the Socialist Unity Party ("Sozialistische Einheitspartei Deutschlands" / SED) which after October 1949 became the ruling party in the Soviet sponsored German Democratic Republic, a new kind of German one-party dictatorship. By the end of 1946 Brockdorff had become an SED party member. His daughter later recalled that following her mother's death, in the Soviet zone (later East Germany), she and her father "enjoyed many advantages, because [surviving] members of [what the Nazis had disparagingly termed] the "Rote Kapelle" ("Red Orchestra") were celebrated as antifascist heroes."

Between 1947 and 1949 Brockdorff was employed as a senior official in the "German Administration for People's Education" ("Deutschen Verwaltung für Volksbildung"). During this period, in 1948, he married the author and former resistance activist Eva Lippold (born Eva Rutkowskaya). They set up home together at Kallinchen near Zossen, a short distance to the south of Berlin. In 1950 Cay von Brockdorff received a doctorate.

In 1953 Brockdorff became the first editor in chief of the magazine Bildende Kunst, a publication produced jointly by the National Commission for the Arts ("Staatliche Kommission für Kunstangelegenheiten") and by the state approved National Association of Visual Artists ("Verband Bildender Künstler der DDR"), an organisation to which those wishing to pursue a career in the visual arts were in effect obliged to belong. However, during 1954 he resigned the editorship and resumed his life as a "freelance artist". His successor, who took over with effect from Issue 3 of the newly launched publication, was another surviving anti-Nazi resistance activist, the cartoonist and caricaturist Herbert Sandberg who, despite a discretely satirical approach, managed to stay in the post till 1957. Between 1955 and 1956 he was deputy general director of the State Art Collection in Dresden. After that, From Autumn 1957 till his retirement, he was director at the newly rebuilt Marcher Museum in Berlin.

Towards the end of the 1950s he was excluded from the party.

== Output ==
Cay von Brockdorff wrote a number of books on art history, notably "Soviet Artists, building peace" (1952), "Soviet and pre-revolutionary Russian art" (1953 ), "German Painting" (1954) and "Finnish graphic art" (1954).
