= Erika von Brockdorff =

German Countess and resistance fighter (1911–1943)

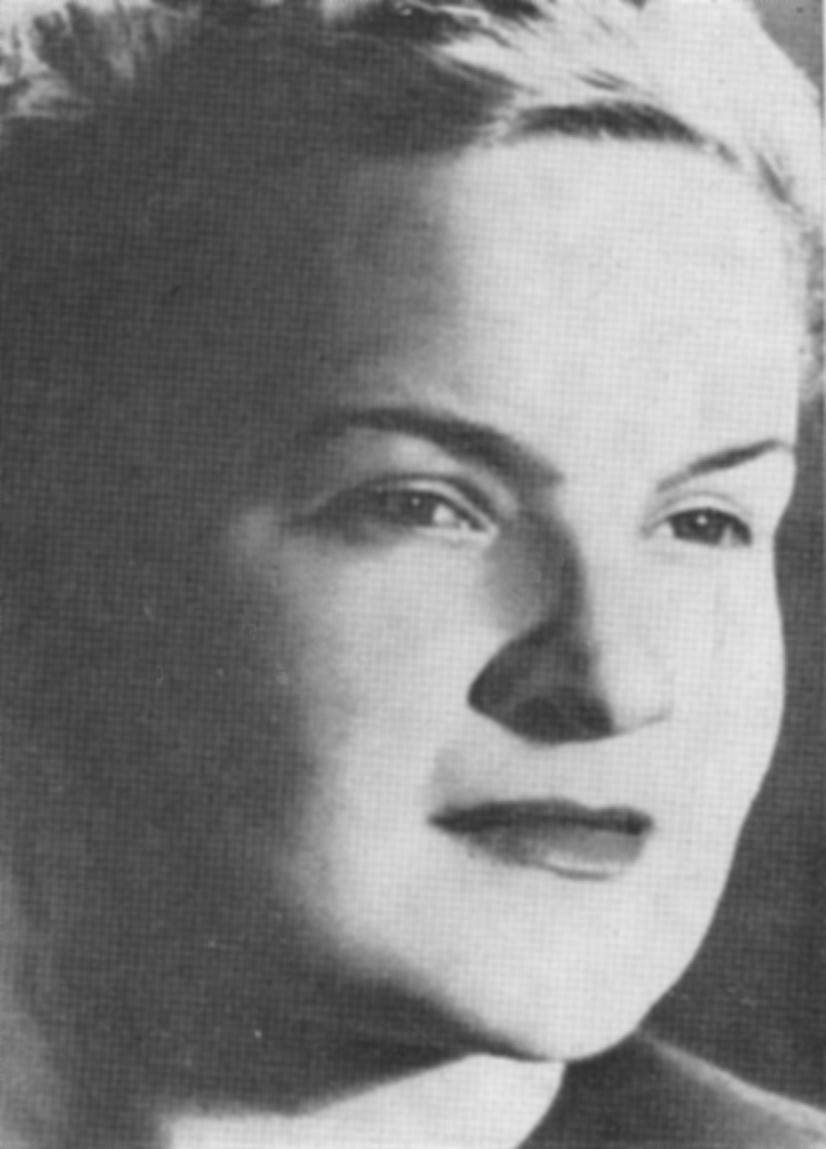
- Erika von Brockdorff
- Born: Erika Schönfeldt; 29 April 1911; Kolberg, Kingdom of Prussia, Germany
- Died: 13 May 1943 (aged 32); Plötzensee Prison; Berlin, Nazi Germany
- Cause of death: Decapitation
- Occupations: Resistance member, secretary
- Known for: Member of Rote Kapelle (Red Orchestra resistance group
- Spouse: Cay von Brockdorff (m. 1937–1943)
- Children: 1
- Mother: Sophie Ennenbach

Erika von Brockdorff (née Schönfeldt) (29 April 1911 – 13 May 1943) was a German resistance fighter against the Nazi regime during the Second World War. Brockdorff was a member of what the Reich Security Main Office termed the Red Orchestra resistance movement.

== Life ==
Brockdorff was born in Kolberg (Kołobrzeg), Province of Pomerania, on Pomerania's Baltic Sea coast.

Her father worked for the post office. From 1929, after finishing middle school and housekeeping school in Magdeburg, she worked in Berlin as a housekeeper and a model, and also, after additional training in shorthand typing, as an office specialist. In 1937, she married the sculptor Graf Cay–Hugo von Brockdorff, and shortly thereafter, their daughter Saskia was born.

From 1941, Brockdorff put her flat at Hans Coppi's resistance movement's disposal as their radio headquarters (she was having an affair with Coppi at the time). She was soon arrested along with the other Red Orchestra members and sent to Charlottenburg Women's Prison. She was sentenced at the Reichskriegsgericht to ten years in labour prison (Zuchthaus) in January 1943. Adolf Hitler was not satisfied with this, however, and on the very same day as the judgment, on his orders, the sentence was changed to death. Together with Mildred Harnack, she waited another four months for the sentence to be carried out; her colleague Elfriede Paul was one of the few who escaped the death sentence. On the evening of 13 May 1943, she was put to death, by guillotine, along with thirteen other persons at Plötzensee Prison in Berlin.

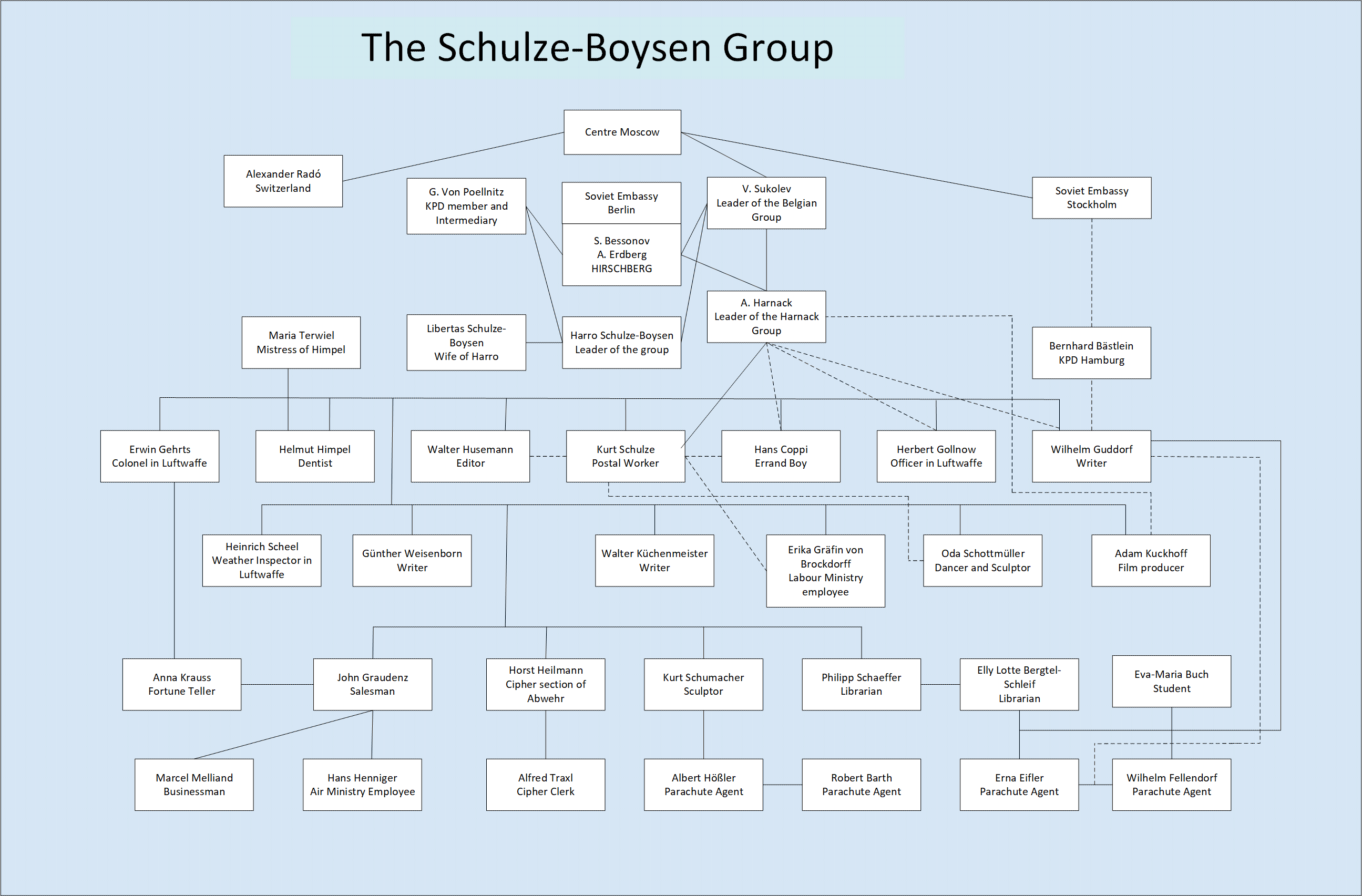
The Schulze-Boysen group in Germany

== Bibliography ==
- Frömel, Johann. "Brockdorff, Erika Gräfin von". Kulturstiftung der deutschen Vertriebenen. Bonn: Kulturstiftung der deutschen Vertriebenen für Wissenschaft und Forschung. Archived from the original on 19 March 2024.
- Hildebrandt, Sabine (January 2013). "The women on stieve's list: Victims of national socialism whose bodies were used for anatomical research". Clinical Anatomy. 26 (1): 3–21. doi:10.1002/ca.22195. hdl:2027.42/94885. PMID 23238847.
- Wörmann, Heinrich-Wilhelm (2002). Widerstand in Schöneberg und Tempelhof (PDF) (in German). Berlin: Gedenkstätte Deutscher Widerstand. p. 171.
