= Yves Hervouet =

French sinologist

- Born: 30 April 1921; Remouillé, French Republic
- Died: 29 January 1999 (aged 77); Saint-Maur-des-Fossés, France

Academic background
- Education: Université Grenoble Alpes; Institut national des langues et civilisations orientales

Academic work
- Discipline: Sinology, Chinese literature
- Institutions: École française d'Extrême-Orient; University of Bordeaux; Paris 8 University; Paris Diderot University

Chinese name
- Traditional Chinese: 吳德明
- Simplified Chinese: 吴德明
Transcriptions
Standard Mandarin
- Hanyu Pinyin: Wú Démíng

Yves Hervouet (30 April 1921 – 29 January 1999) was a French sinologist, specializing in classical Chinese literature. He was professor emeritus at the Paris Diderot University as well as an appointed Legion of Honour officer.

== Biography ==
Yves Hervouet studied Classics at Grenoble Alpes University. He entered the École nationale des langues orientales vivantes, where he won a scholarship to study in Beijing. He was then recruited by the École nationale des langues orientales vivantes and spent time in Hanoi, Hong Kong and Tokyo from 1951 to 1953.

He went on to teach at the University of Bordeaux, then helped set up the University of Vincennes, where he was appointed Professor of Chinese in 1969. He then went on to teach at the Paris Diderot University, where he heads the UER Langues et civilisations d'Asie orientale .

He organized the XIXth International Orientalist Congress at the Sorbonne (building) in 1973.

== Bibliography ==
- "Yves Hervouet". École française d'Extrême-Orient. Archived from the original on 2008-11-18.
