= Antoine Franckx =

Belgian footballer

Personal information
- Date of birth: 3 January 1909
- Date of death: 23 January 1999 (aged 90)

International career
Years	Team	Apps	(Gls)
1936	Belgium	2	(0)

Antoine Franckx (3 January 1909 – 23 January 1999) was a Belgian footballer. He played in two matches for the Belgium national football team in 1936.
