= Charlie Skeen =

American actor and stuntman

- Skeen in Star Trek VI: The Undiscovered Country, 1991
- Born: William Charles Skeen; February 5, 1949
- Died: January 12, 1999 (aged 49); Cedar Hill, Texas, U.S.
- Occupations: Actor, stuntman

William Charles Skeen (February 5, 1949 – January 12, 1999) was an American actor and stuntman.

== Life and career ==
Skeen was born on February 5, 1949, the son of Bill Skeen. He began his screen career in 1981, becoming a stuntman for Steve Carver's film An Eye for an Eye. He performed stunts for actors, Ross Hagen, Christopher Plummer, Pernell Roberts and David Carradine.

Later in his career, Skeen performed stunts in the television programs Star Trek: The Next Generation, Matlock and Alien Nation. He also performed stunts in the films Star Trek IV: The Voyage Home, Lone Wolf McQuade, Invasion U.S.A., Avenging Force, Allan Quatermain and the Lost City of Gold, Back to the Beach and Bulletproof. In 1991, he played a klingon soldier in the film Star Trek VI: The Undiscovered Country.

== Death ==
Skeen died of a heart attack on the set of the CBS action crime television series Walker, Texas Ranger at Cedar Hill State Park in Cedar Hill, Texas on January 12, 1999, at the age of 49.
