= Helmut Roloff =

German musician and spy (1912–2001)

- Helmut Roloff (1940s)
- Born: 9 October 1912; Giessen, German Empire
- Died: 29 September 2001 (aged 88); Berlin, Germany
- Education: Landgraf-Ludwigs-Gymnasium, Giessen. Hochschule für Musik, Berlin
- Occupations: Concert pianist, teacher, recording artist
- Employer(s): Berlin Hochschule für Musik/Universität der Künste Berlin, Fakultät 3
- Organization: Schulze-Boysen/Harnack Resistance Group ("Rote Kapelle") 1941-42
- Known for: Piano repertoire. War-time anti-Nazi resistance
- Honours: Berliner Kunstpreis 1950. Order of the Sacred Treasure (Japan) 1990.

Helmut Roloff (9 October 1912 – 29 September 2001) was a German pianist, recording artist, teacher and resistance fighter against the Nazi regime. In September 1942 Roloff was arrested in Berlin in the roundup of an anti-Nazi resistance group allegedly at the centre of a wider European espionage network identified by the Abwehr under the cryptonym the Red Orchestra (Rote Kapelle). Covered by comrades who persuaded their interrogators that his contact with the group had been unwitting, he was spared execution and released.

After the war, Roloff taught at the Academy of Music (Hochschule für Musik Berlin) in West Berlin, serving as the school's director before his retirement in 1978. He promoted the work of modernist composers excluded from concert halls during the Third Reich, while cultivating, in his recording career, the classical-romantic repertoire.

== Early life, witness to Nazi persecution ==
Roloff was born in university and garrison town of Giessen in Hesse-Darmstadt where his father, Gustav Roloff, was a professor of history (a student of European colonial policy and the continental balance of power). His mother, Elisabeth, was musically gifted and introduced her son to the piano, but he first pursued studies in law.

After the Nazi seizure of power in January 1933, as a regular guest in the home of the Leipzig jurist Leo Rosenberg, Roloff witnessed the effects of the newly licensed harassment of Jewish people. He began to think of music as a career in which he would not be as directly compromised by the law's corruption. Meanwhile life for Roloff and his parents was becoming impossible in Giessen. On the day of the first Nazi boycott of Jewish businesses, 1 April 1933, his father conspicuously walked with a Jewish colleague through the centre of town. But in the university Roloff recalls "a great rush as the sheep willingly joined the SA [...] I don't think there was a single one of my friends and acquaintances who didn't join". In 1936 the family moved to the greater anonymity of Berlin.

In 1935 Roloff graduated from the Hochschule für Musik (HfM, today the Universität der Künste Berlin, Fakultät 3), from which Jewish teachers such as Leonid Kreutzer, Emanuel Feuermann, and Artur Schnabel had already been dismissed and expelled. Roloff studied with Richard Rössler and later, in 1938, privately with Wladimir Horbowski who introduced him to the Mendelssohn family. Roloff found a teaching position, alongside Horbowski, at the Klindworth-Scharwenka Conservatory and began to give concerts.

The family's Berlin apartment was in what Roloff describes as a "totally Jewish building". Arrests and deportations began in 1939, precipitating the suicide of a neighbour. Roloff insists that "If people say they didn't know about such things, that's not true. People knew. Many in Berlin, the big city, knew that the Jews were being corralled at Grunewald Station and taken east".

== Wartime resistance ==
The music historian Fred K. Prieberg observes that in the Third Reich two thirds of musicians, many of them before 1933, "thought it opportune to join the NSDAP in a hurry" (a higher percentage than for physicians, otherwise thought to be, next to lawyers for whom there was little choice, the most Nazified of the professions). Roloff was among the exceptions, not only in refusing party membership but also in deciding he had to do something against the regime.

His first encounter with talk of organised resistance was in 1937 when he befriended, recently released from detention, a Protestant pastor called Weckerling from the dissident Confessing Church (Bekennende Kirche).

In the winter of 1941, Roloff was introduced by the dentist and music lover Helmut Himpel to a resistance group in Berlin centred around the couples Adam and Greta Kuckhoff, Harro and Libertas Schulze-Boysen and Arvid and Mildred Harnack. On 17 September 1942, the Gestapo, who had had his associates under surveillance, searched Roloff's family apartment. Under a piano they found a locked suitcase that Himpel, following the earlier arrest of Harro Schulz-Boysen, had given him for safekeeping a few days before. It contained a Soviet-supplied (but functionless) short-wave radio transmitter.

Roloff's arrest was reported in The New York Times (6 October 1942) as part of a "big clean up in Berlin": "the majority of the person arrested were intellectuals, lawyers, actors and artists, and among them the well-known German musician, Helmut Roloff, who was taken into custody just a few hours before he was due to give a large concert in a hall sold out in advance".

Taken to Gestapo headquarters in Prinz-Albrecht-Strasse, Roloff was held shackled for two weeks in a basement cell. During his interrogations, he insisted that he had thought the case contained apples or other illegal gifts of food from Himpel's patients. He was whispered encouragement by an officer Roloff suspected of having been a regular policeman: "You've presented your case quite well. Now stick with it".

Moved to Spandau Prison, Roloff found ways of coordinating his testimony with Himpel and with his cell neighbour, the Communist journalist John Graudenz. On 26 January 1943 Roloff was released. Himpel's last words to him were "You will become a great pianist".

Over the following months, 49 members of the group (19 women and 30 men) including Himpel, his fiancé Maria Terwiel, and Graudenz, were executed by hanging or beheading at Plötzensee Prison.

Among other anti-Nazi material copied on Maria Terwiel's typewriter, Roloff, Himpel, Graudenz and others posted to people in important positions, passed to foreign correspondents, and distributed across Berlin, was Bishop von Galen's sermon condemning the Aktion T4 euthanasia program and a polemic entitled "Fear for Germany's future grips the people" (Die Sorge um Deutschlands Zukunft geht durch das Volk). Roloff also dropped this leaflet in mail boxes across the district of Dahlem. Written by Harro Schulze-Boysen with assistance from John Sieg, it was signed "AGIS". Roloff recalled that it offered a "very strong critique of the Nazis":

A class of ridiculous but destructive swindlers and braggarts, alienated from the people, now directs the life of the nation. In times of direst need for Germany, these people lead a life of comfort. Yet the conscience of all true patriots revolts against the whole present exercise of German power in Europe [...] In the name of the Reich, the most horrible tortures and brutalities are being committed against civilians and prisoners. Each day of war brings unimaginable pain and suffering. Each day increases the bill we will have to pay in the end [...] What can the individual do to bring his will to bear? Each must seek, wherever he can, to do the exact opposite of what this present regime demands of him.

Recipients were urged to "send this letter out into the world as often as you can! Pass it on to friends and workmates!" and were assured: "You are not alone! Start fighting of your own accord, then in groups. TOMORROW GERMANY WILL BE OURS!"

Roloff and his group had also tried to provide practical assistance to Jews still living in Berlin. They secured personal papers and supplied forged documentation.

=== The "Red Orchestra" ===
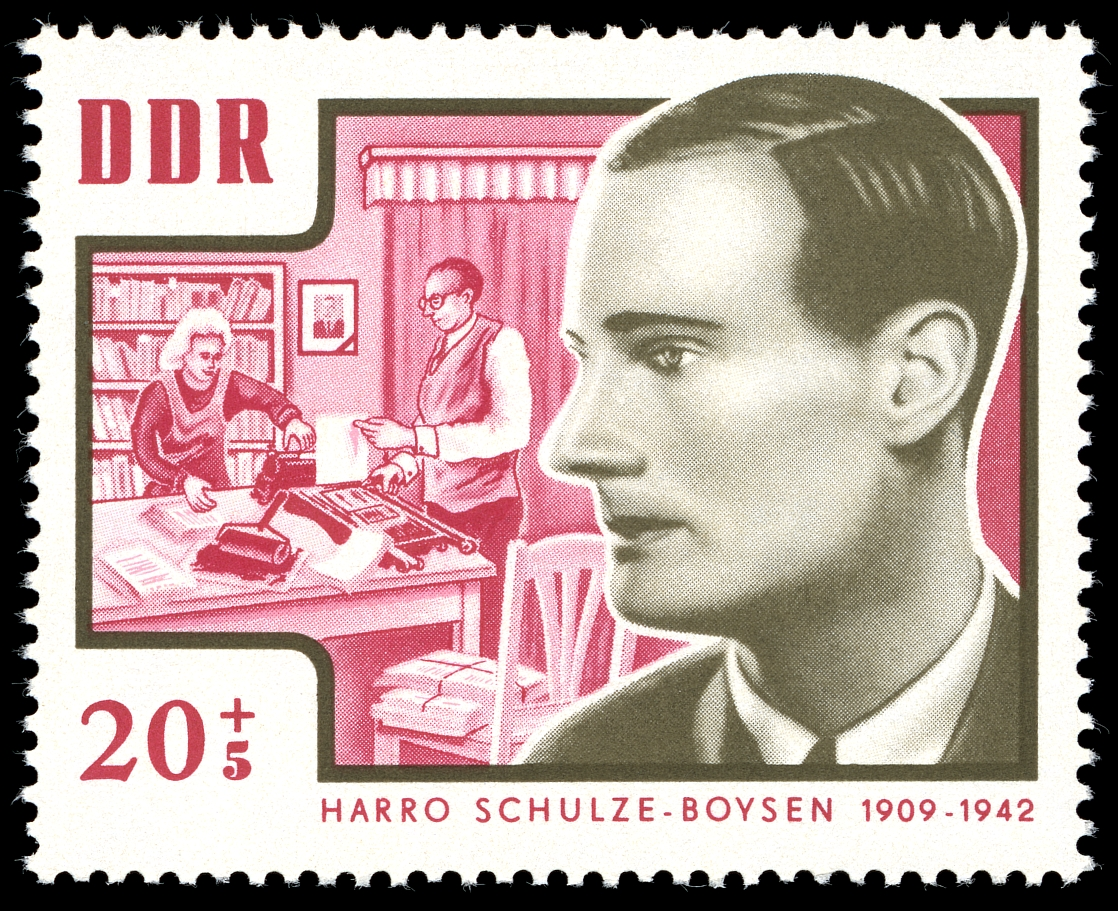
Harro Schulze-Boysen; GDR (1964)

Roloff never regarded himself, whether by sympathy or affiliation, a communist (his wife Inge described him rather as a "lifelong conservative"). That, nonetheless, was the suspicion of the western-sector Allies. They noted that he maintained contacts in the Soviet sector of Berlin, and had been a guest of the Polish military mission.

The post-war view of the Harnack/Schulze-Boysen network remained very much that which had been drawn by their interrogators. As late as 1969, the testimony and records of Gestapo, and of the Reich Military Tribunal (Reichskriegsgericht), officials informed a series on the "history of the Red Orchestra espionage ring" in the weekly Der Spiegel. Under a picture of German eastern-front military graves, it asked whether "hundred of thousands of soldiers" had been "betrayed by the Red Orchestra?" The East German regime reinforced the view of the group as a Communist cell by manipulating the group's history to fit their own agenda, specifically to reinforce the German-Soviet friendship and to legitimise their own espionage activity as anti-fascist.

Roloff rarely spoke of his wartime experience until he was extensively interviewed by his son Stefan beginning in 1998. Although he had not been party to it, his group had engaged in military espionage (three months before their arrests, Graudenz and Harro Schulze-Boysen had tried to communicate to the British that the Germans had broken their naval communications code), and they had had Soviet contacts. These had been ineffective in persuading Stalin of their reports in June 1941 of preparations for a German invasion, and proved their undoing: the Abwehr intercepted contact details for Adman Kuckoff and for the Schulz-Boysons radioed by Moscow to an agent in Brussels.

Stefan Roloff's subsequent research confirmed what others have found. The Red Orchestra was largely a Cold-War myth tying together disparate groups of resisters and dissidents neither directed by the Soviets nor co-ordinated among themselves. Among the individuals associated in the activities of the Harnack/Schulze-Boysen network (counting perhaps a hundred, twice the number executed) there was a "pluralism" of political and philosophical viewpoints ("weltanschauliche Pluralität"). Under totalitarian conditions resistance is generally too individual a decision, Stefan Roloff's concludes, for the groups that form (in the "catacombs") to adhere to any one ideological line. The resister is not by nature a follower.

In 2009 the German Bundestag unanimously agreed to vacate all war-time convictions of treason under National Socialism and to rehabilitate their victims.

== Post-war career ==
After the end of the war in 1945, Roloff found a position in the re-established Berlin Academy of Music (Hochschule für Musik Berlin) in Charlottenburg. He was appointed professor in 1950, full professor in 1953, and director of the school in 1970. In 1975 the school was incorporated in the Berlin University of Arts (Hochschule der Künste Berlin) of which Roloff, on his retirement in 1978, was made an honorary senator.

Roloff worked as a concert pianist and piano teacher throughout his life. He championed the modernists denied performance during the Third Reich. Six months from the end of the war, Berliner Rundfunk broadcast Roloff playing Sergei Prokofiev. From the summer of 1947 he led seminars in contemporary music at the new International Institute for Music in Darmstadt beginning with performances of Paul Hindemith and Manuel de Falla. But above all Roloff cultivated the classical-romantic repertoire. For Deutsche Grammaphon he recorded Beethoven, Mendelssohn, Mozart, Weber and Schubert.

In 1990, Roloff received the Order of the Sacred Treasure, Gold Rays with Neck Ribbon, from the Japanese government for his contributions to Japanese music, including teaching Takahiro Sonoda, Toyoaki Matsuura and other Japanese pianists.

Helmut Roloff died in his home in Berlin on 29 September 2001. He was survived by his wife Inge Roloff, his sons Stefan Roloff (artist and film maker), Ulrich Roloff (flutist), and Johannes Roloff (pianist).

Stefan Roloff wrote a wartime biography of his father and of the Red Orchestra, published by the Ullstein Press in 2004. His film documentary, The Red Orchestra, was nominated for Best Foreign Film 2005 by the US Women Critics Circle.

== Bibliography ==
- Kater, Michael H. (1997) The Twisted Muse: Musicians and their music in the third reich. New York & Oxford, 1997; Oxford University Press. ISBN 0-19-509620-7. Pages 224-5
- Nelson, Anne (2009). Red Orchestra: The Story of the Berlin Underground and the Circle of Friends Who Resisted Hitler. Random House Publishing Group. p. 331. ISBN 978-1-58836-799-0.
- Fischer-Defoy, Christine (1996) KUNST MACHT POLITIK. Die Nazifizierung der Kunst- und Musikhochschulen in Berlin. (S. 298), Hochschule der Künste, Presse und Informationsstelle, Berlin (Lizenz des Elefanten-Press-Verlags), ISBN 3-89462-048-X
- Gert Rosiejka (1996) Die Rote Kapelle, „Landesverrat“ als antifaschistischer Widerstand. ergebnisse-Verlag, Hamburg, ISBN 3-925622-16-0.
- Stefan Roloff (2004) Die Rote Kapelle. Die Widerstandsgruppe im Dritten Reich und die Geschichte Helmut Roloffs. Ullstein-Verlag, Berlin 2004 ISBN 3-548-36669-4.
