= Maria Terwiel =

German resistance fighter (1910–1943)

Mimi Terwiel
- Born: Maria Terwiel; 7 June 1910; Boppard, Rhineland-Palatinate, German Empire
- Died: 5 August 1943 (aged 33); Plötzensee Prison, Berlin, Nazi Germany
- Cause of death: Execution by guillotine
- Occupations: Trainee lawyer, then typist
- Movement: Member of the Red Orchestra ("Rote Kapelle")

Maria "Mimi" Terwiel (7 June 1910 – 5 August 1943) was a German resistance fighter against the Nazi regime. She was active in a group in Berlin that wrote and distributed anti-Nazi and anti-war appeals. In September 1942, the Gestapo arrested Terwiel along with her fiancée Helmut Himpel, as part of what it conceived as a broader action against a collection of anti-fascist resistance groups in Germany and occupied Europe, identified by the Abwehr as the Red Orchestra. Among the leaflets and pamphlets Terwiel and Himpel had copied and distributed for the group were the July and August 1941 sermons of Clemens August Graf von Galen, which denounced the regime's Aktion T4 programme of involuntary euthanasia.

Terwiel was sentenced to death on 26 January 1943, and on 5 August 1943 was guillotined in Berlin-Plötzensee.

== Life ==
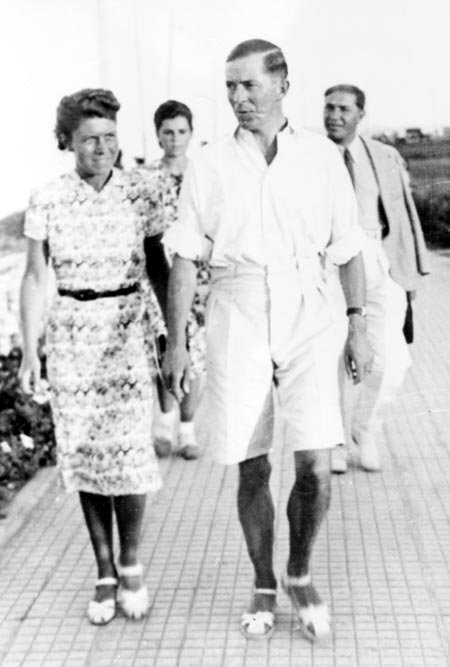
Maria Terwiel and Helmut Himpel

Maria Terwiel was born on 7 June 1910 in Boppard am Rhein. She completed her Abitur at a Gymnasium in Stettin in 1931, where her father, Johannes Terwiel, a devoutly Catholic Prussian civil servant, worked as a provincial deputy commissioner, while her mother was Jewish, which would limit Mimi's professional aspirations after 1933. She studied law at the University of Freiburg, where she met her future fiancé, Helmut Himpel, and at the Ludwig-Maximilians-Universität München. As a Social Democrat, her father was dismissed from office after Hitler came to power in 1933. The family had moved to Berlin, where she found a job as a secretary In a German-Swiss textile company.

Classed under the 1935 Nuremberg Laws as "Half-Jewess" ("Halbjüdin"), Terwiel realised that she could no longer finish her studies, as she would never be able to get a position as a trainee lawyer. Her legal dissertion, titled Die Allgemeinen Geschäftsbedingungen der Banken. insbesondere die Pfandklausel (The General Terms and Conditions of Banks, in Particular the Deposit Clause), was ready to be submitted to the Faculty of Law and Political Science at the Albert Ludwig University in Freiburg in 1935. Terwiel also painfully realised that she was forbidden to marry Himpel. They nonetheless lived together in Berlin; Hempel running a successful dentistry practice, and Terwiel finding work as a secretary in a French-Swiss textile company.

== Resistance ==
With Himpel, who secretly and without charge continued to treat Jewish patients, Terwiel began helping Jews in hiding. They helped furnish them with identification and ration cards. A patient of Himpel's, the Communist writer John Graudenz, in 1939/40 brought them into contact with a broader resistance group in the city centred around the couples Adam and Greta Kuckhoff, Harro and Libertas Schulze-Boysen and Arvid and Mildred Harnack. For the Abwehr and Gestapo this, in turn, placed the couple in the frame of a wider European espionage network which, focusing upon Soviet contacts and Communist participants, they identified under the cryptonym Rote Kapelle (the Red Orchestra).

On her typewriter, Terwiel copied anti-Nazi material supplied by the group that she, together with Himpel, Graudenz, the pianist Helmut Roloff, and others posted to people in important positions, passed to foreign correspondents, and distributed across Berlin. This included Bishop von Galen's sermon condemning the Aktion T4 euthanasia program and a polemic entitled "Fear for Germany's future grips the people" (Die Sorge um Deutschlands Zukunft geht durch das Volk).

Signed AGIS, the leaflet was written by Harro Schulze-Boysen with assistance from John Sieg. It declared that "the most disgraceful tortures and cruelties are being perpetrated on civilians and prisoners in the name of the Reich" and that each day of war increased "the bill" that Germans in the end would have to pay. "Who", it asked, "cannot see now that the entire much praised social improvement in the Third Reich, the job creation, the Volkswagen, and many another things were nothing but preparation for war and armament?!" The only means Hitler had known for relieving unemployment was "the extermination of millions through a new war". A genuine "socialist revolution" lay in the future: the immediate task of "true patriots" and "all those who have maintained a sense of true values" was to do, wherever possible, the exact opposite of what the Nazi regime demanded of them.

In a campaign initiated by Graudenz, on 17 May 1942, Terwiel, Schulze-Boysen, and nineteen others travelled across five Berlin neighbourhoods to paste the stickers on posters for the Nazi propaganda exhibition The Soviet Paradise (Das Sowjet-Paradies). The sticker read, "Permanent Exhibition. The Nazi Paradise. War, Hunger, Lies, Gestapo. How much longer?" The exhibit itself was the subject of an arson attack by a leftist group of underground Jews, led by Herbert Baum, more than twenty of whom were subsequently hunted down and executed.

== Arrest ==
Following her arrest on 17 September 1942 and brutal interrogation, Terwiel was sentenced to death for treason on 26 January 1943 by the Reichskriegsgericht ("Reich War Tribunal"). Maria Terwiel was guillotined at Plötzensee Prison in Berlin on 5 August 1943. She was 33 years old. Himpel had preceded her, executed in May. In her immediate resistance circle, only Helmut Roloff was to survive.

Three days after sentencing she wrote to her two younger siblings, Gerd and Ursula: "I have absolutely no fear of death and certainly not of divine judgement: that at least we don't have to fear. Stay true to your principles and forever and always stick together". In a farewell letter to a Polish cellmate, Krystyna Wituska, she gave legal advice and formulated appeals for clemency for her fellow prisoners (her own was rejected personally by Hitler). Terwiel also wrote a song, “O head full of blood and wounds” in which she called on Christ to "appear to me as a shield to comfort me in my death".

== Literature ==
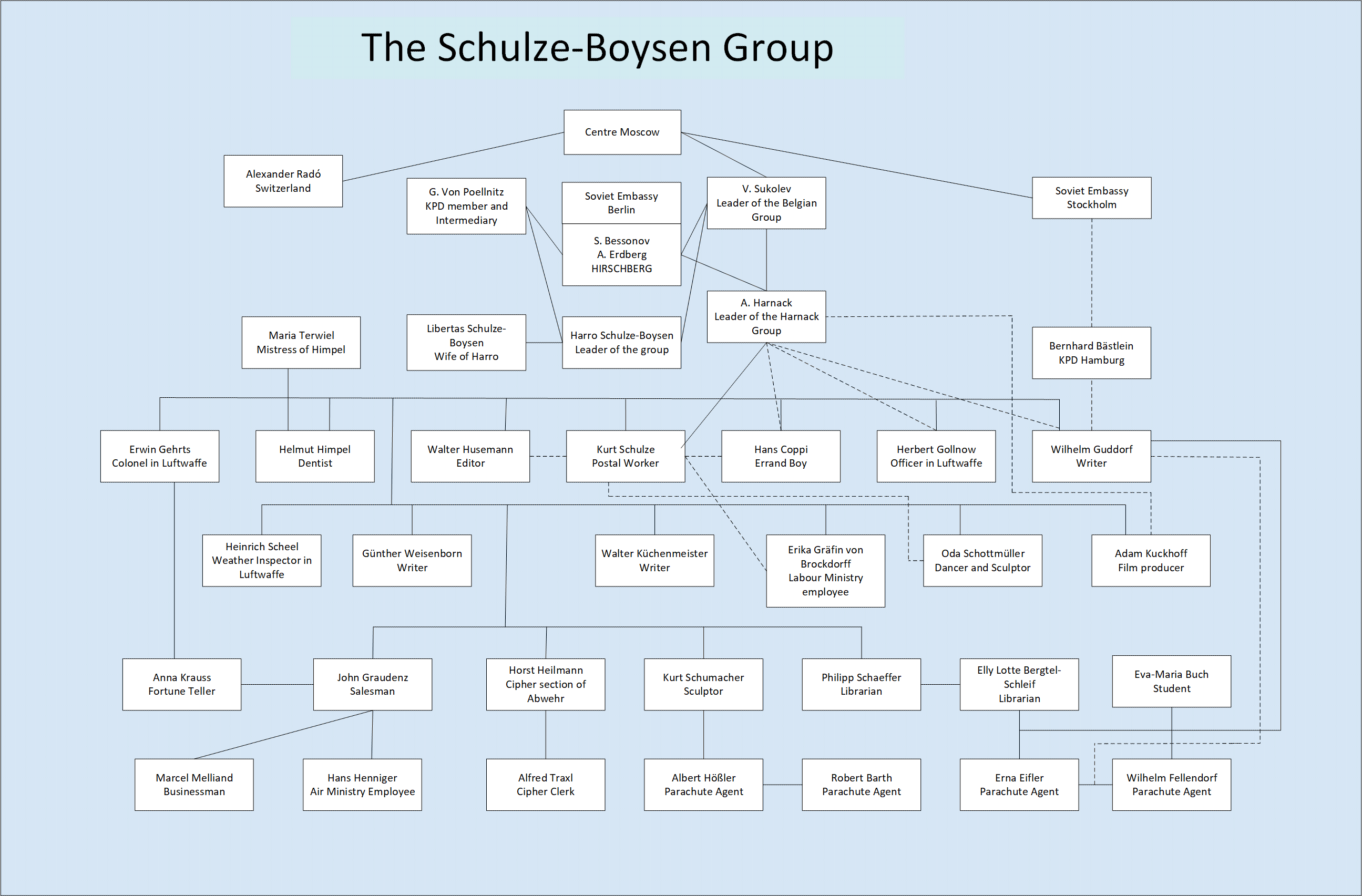
The Schulze-Boysen group in Germany

- Roloff, Stefan (2002). Die Rote Kapelle. Die Widerstandsgruppe im Dritten Reich und die Geschichte Helmut Roloffs (in German). Berlin: Ullstein. ISBN 3-548-36669-4..
- Pruß, Ursula (2014), Maria Terwiel. In: Helmut Moll, (ed.), Zeugen für Christus. Das deutsche Martyrologium des 20. Jahrhunderts, Paderborn, vol. I, pp 146–149. ISBN 978-3-506-78080-5
- Tuchel, Johannes (1994), Maria Terwiel und Helmut Himpel. Christen in der Roten Kapelle. In: Hans Coppi junior, Jürgen Danyel, Johannes Tuchel (eds): Die Rote Kapelle im Widerstand gegen den Nationalsozialismus, Berlin: Edition Hentrich. ISBN 3894681101, pp. 213–
