= Helmut Himpel =

German dentist and resistance fighter

- Helmut Himpel was a young dentist when he decided to start treating Jews.
- Born: 14 September 1907; Schönau im Schwarzwald
- Died: 13 May 1943 (aged 35); Plötzensee Prison, Berlin
- Citizenship: German
- Occupation: Dentist
- Movement: Member of the Red Orchestra ("Rote Kapelle")
- Spouse: Maria Terwiel

Helmut Himpel (14 September 1907 - 13 May 1943) was a German dentist and resistance fighter against Nazism. He was a member of the anti-fascist resistance group that was later called the Red Orchestra by the Abwehr. Himpel along with his fiancé Maria Terwiel were notable for distributing leaflets and pamphlets for the group. Specifically this included the July and August 1941 sermons of Clemens August Graf von Galen. The second leaflet the couple posted, on Aktion T4 denouncing the murders of the sick by euthanasia, induced Hitler to stop the euthanasia murders and find other ways to do it.

== Life ==
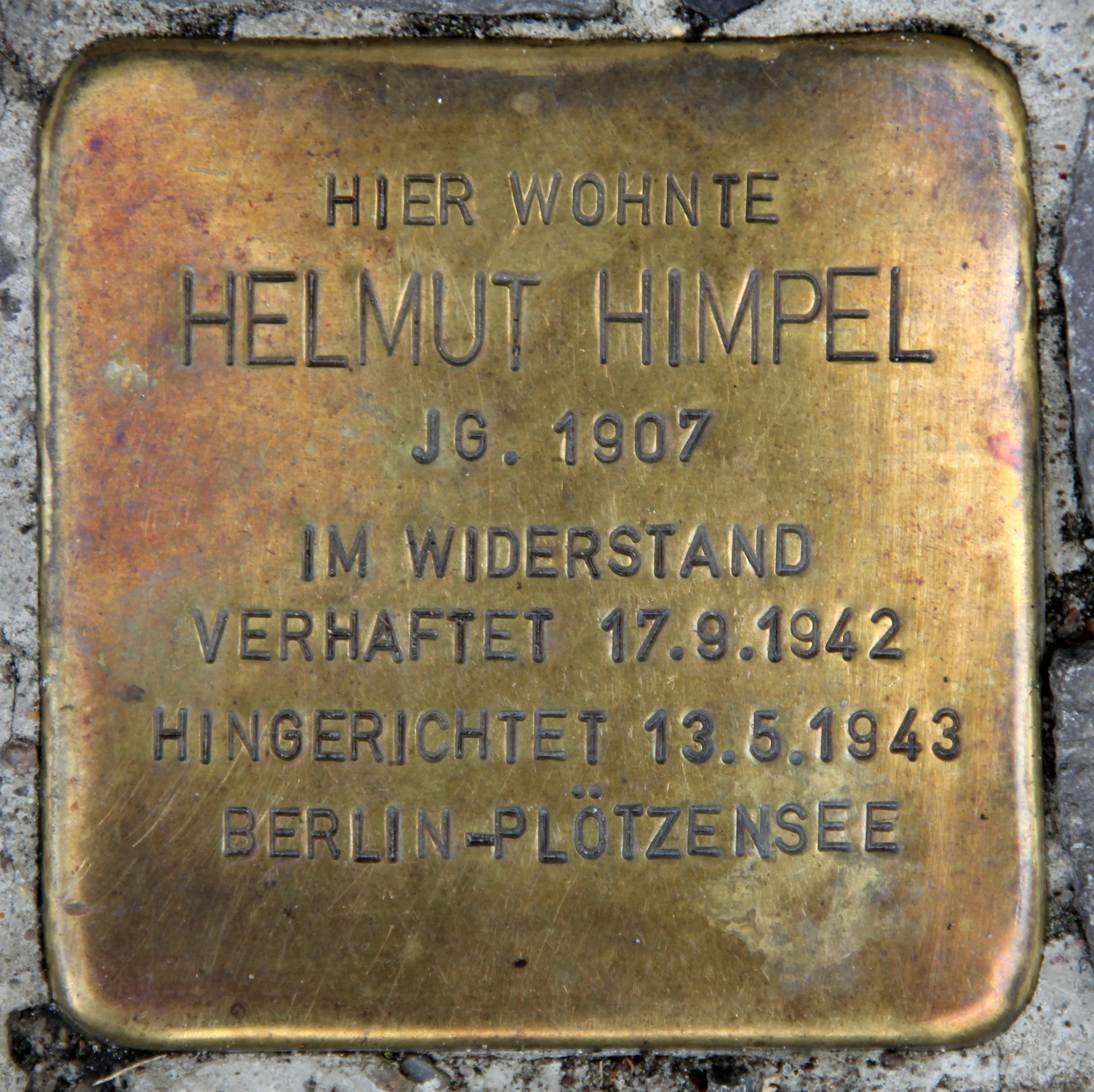
Stolperstein of Helmut Himpel at 72 Lietzenburger Straße in Charlottenburg, Berlin

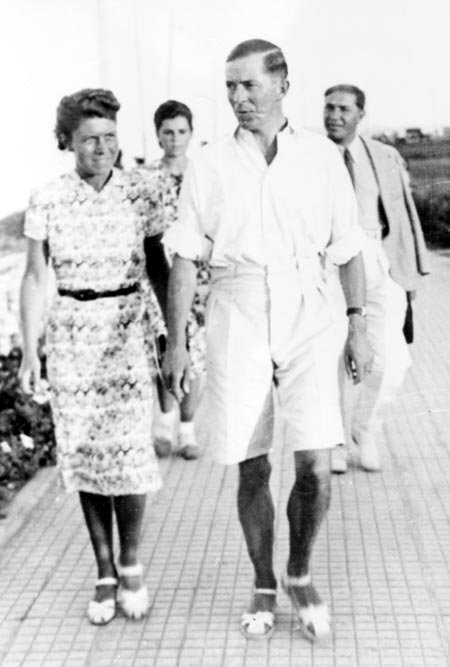
Maria Terwiel and Helmut Himpel

Himpel studied electrical engineering at the University of Karlsruhe and in 1926 became a member of the Germania fraternity there (now Karlsruher Burschenschaft Teutonia). He then studied dentistry in Freiburg and Munich. During his studies, Himpel met his future fiancée Maria Terwiel. However, they were not allowed to marry due to the Nuremberg Laws as Terwiel was classed as half-Jewish (Halbjüdin). After Himpel was awarded his doctorate, they both moved to Berlin, where Himpel opened a dental practice around 1937 at 6 Lietzenburger Strasse. Himpel was successful as a dentist, for example, his patients included many members of the diplomatic corps, actors and artists, such as Heinz Rühmann.

== Resistance ==
During the Third Reich, Himpel treated Jewish patients secretly and free of charge as well as those victims of Nazi persecution. He also treated Jewish patients living far away who could not visit his doctor's office in their home. And he influenced the examinations of suitability for military service in order to spare conscripts from being deployed at the front. A patient of Himpel's, the Communist writer John Graudenz, in 1939 brought the couple into contact with a broader resistance group in the city centred around the couples Adam and Greta Kuckhoff, Harro and Libertas Schulze-Boysen and Arvid and Mildred Harnack.

On 17 February 1942, Himpel and Terwiel distributed several hundred copies of the pamphlet, a polemic Die Sorge um Deutsch-lands Zukunft geht durch das Volk (Concern for Germany's Future Goes Through the People) that was written by Harro Shulze-Boysen, John Rittmeister and John Sieg.

Himpel and Terwiel were also actively involved in protesting clandestinely.

They protested The Soviet Paradise exhibition (German original title "Das Sowjet-Paradies") in the Lustgarten. This was an exhibition that had been arranged by the Nazis with the express purpose of justifying the invasion of the Soviet Union to the German people. During the night of 17 May 1942, the couple along with 17 other members of the group including Schulze-Boysen, Ursula Goetze, Liane Berkowitz, Otto Gollnow and Friedrich Rehmer travelled across five Berlin neighbourhoods to post stickers bearing the inscription:

Permanent Exhibition
The Nazi Paradise
War, Hunger, Lies, Gestapo
How much longer?

== Arrest ==
On 17 September 1942, Himpel and Terwiel were arrested in Berlin. Himpel was tried by the 2nd Senate of the Reichskriegsgericht, who announced on 26 January 1943 the death penalty because of preparation for high treason and enemy favouritism. On 13 May 1943, he was executed by hanging in Plötzensee Prison. Terwiel was tried on 26 January 1943 by the 2nd Senate of the Reichskriegsgericht who announced the death penalty for the preparation of a treasonous enterprise and enemy favouritism. She was guillotined in Plötzensee Prison in Berlin on 5 August 1943.
