= Pfelling =

Coordinates: 48.8826°N 12.7431°E

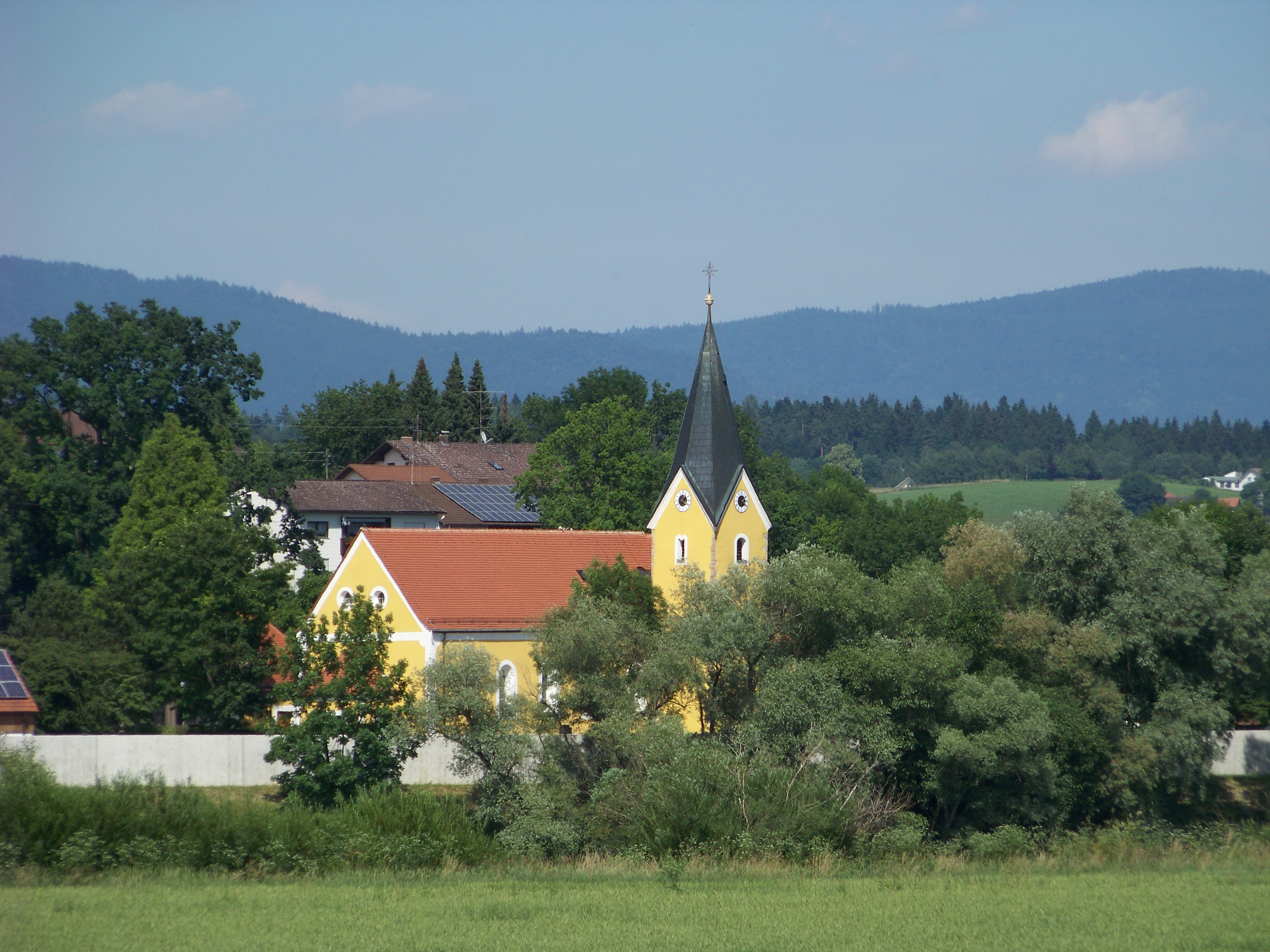
St. Margaretha church

Pfelling is a Pfarrdorf (village with its own church and priest) and a neighborhood of the city of Bogen in the district of Straubing-Bogen in Bavaria, Germany.

When smaller towns and municipalities were merged in Bavaria between 1971 and 1980, Pfelling, formerly its own municipality, lost its independence; on 1 January 1978 it was integrated into the city of Bogen.

Pfelling contains four monumental buildings: the parish church (St. Margaretha Church, part of which from the 13th c.), the parish house (19th c.), a farm house, and a 19th-c. chapel.
