= Villa Schöningen =

Museum in Germany

Coordinates: 52°24′49″N 13°05′16″E

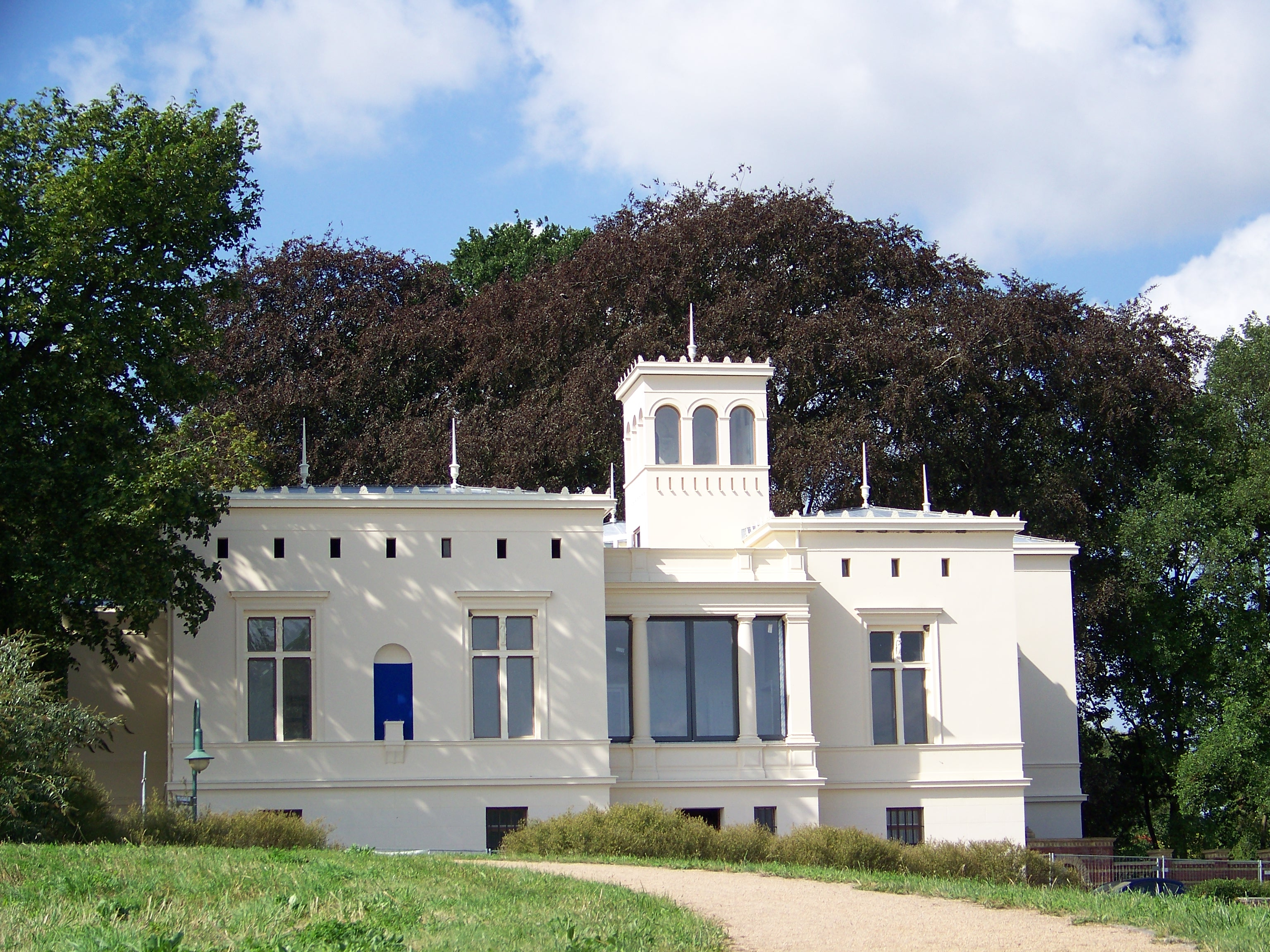
Villa Schöningen in 2009, after an intense renovation.

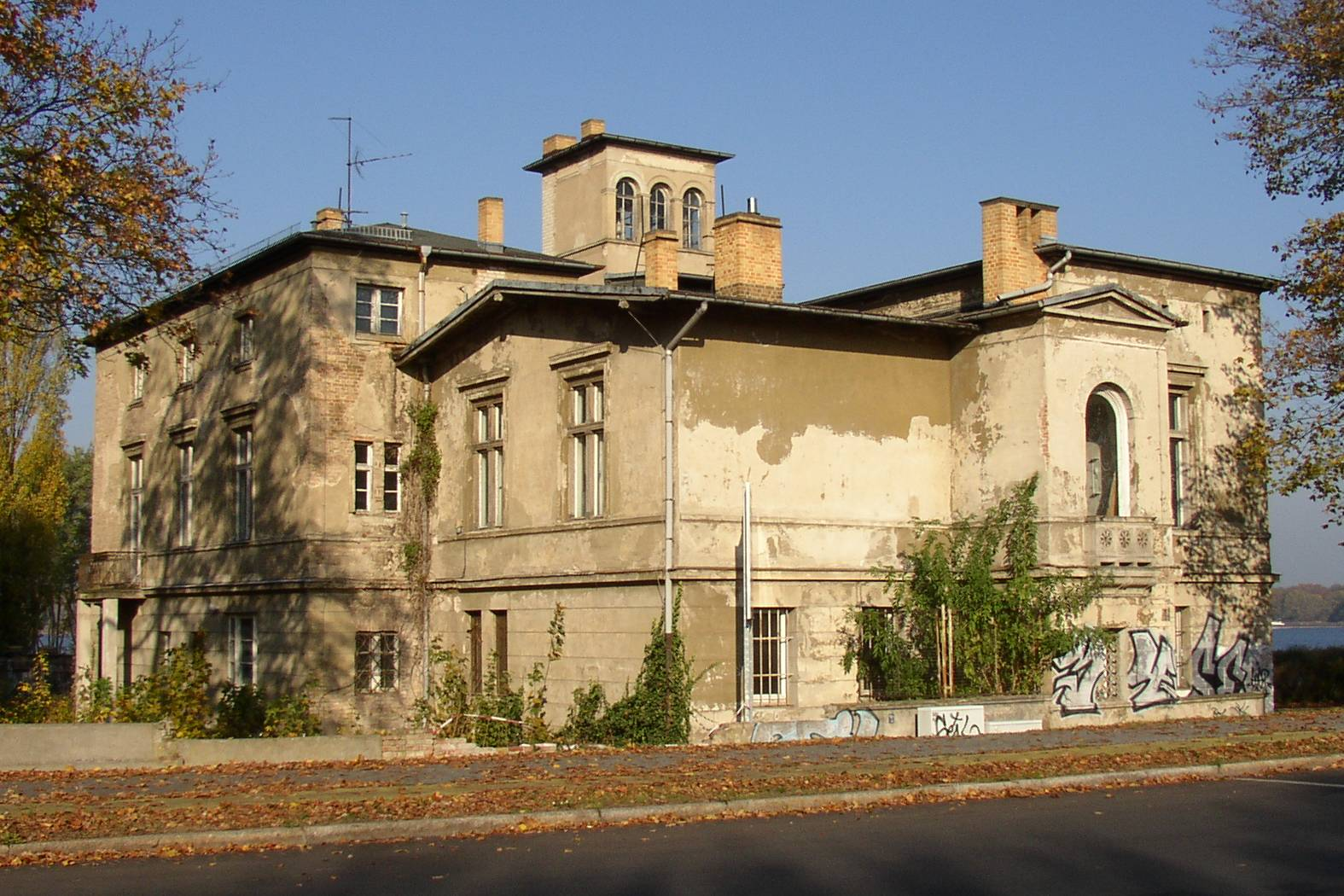
Villa Schöningen in 2006, prior to its renovation. View from the Southwest.

Villa Schöningen is a historic residence in the city of Potsdam, Germany, located at Berliner Straße 86 at the corner with Swan Avenue just west of the Glienicke Bridge, which leads to Berlin.

Since 1977, villa Schöningen has been included in the Heritage List of the State of Brandenburg, and the area around it has been part of the UNESCO World Heritage site Palaces and Parks of Potsdam and Berlin since 1990.

== von Schöning ==
On behalf of the Prussian King Friedrich Wilhelm IV, in 1843 Ludwig Persius designed this house in the Italian Villa style for Kurd von Schöning (1789–1859), the chamberlain of Prince Carl of Prussia. The villa was named after Schoeningen, an East Brunswick city, that was the historical origin of the Schöning family.

The property faced Prince Carl's Glienicke Palace across a bridge. The construction of the villa was facilitated by the Prince both to remove an eyesore, and assist a close friend.

After the death of von Schöning in 1859, the house was sold by his children to Prince Carl, who then resold it to a court council. Moritz Jacoby bought the villa in 1871 and passed it on to his daughter Anna and her husband Hermann Wallich when he died six years later.

== Wallich Family ==
Anna and Hermann Wallich seldom used the house, but Hermann's eldest son Paul was fond of it. After returning from a banking apprentiship in the United States, Paul acquired the property in 1913. Together, Paul and his wife Hildegard raised their three children, Henry, Walter, and Cristel in the villa. At the onset of the Holocaust, Hildegard and her children escaped Germany and survived in the UK. Paul, unable to cope with the political development, stayed in Germany and committed suicide on November 11, 1938.

== The House at the Bridge by Katie Hafner ==
In 1995, the journalist Katie Hafner published a book titled The House at the Bridge, chronicling the history of the house from its construction to the Wallich family's claim to the property following the fall of the Berlin Wall. Hafner's book, which trains a lens on the house and its inhabitants through the years, grew from a 1991 cover story in The New York Times Magazine.

== Museum ==
In November 2009, a historical museum opened in the Villa Schöningen on the 20th anniversary of the fall of the Berlin Wall. It was founded by CEO of Axel Springer Mathias Döpfner and the CEO of RHJI Leonhard Fisher as a privately funded project. The museum was opened by Chancellor Angela Merkel with former U.S. Secretary of State Henry Kissinger and former Soviet leader Mikhail Gorbachev also in attendance.

The museum tells the story of the Glienicke Bridge, which from 1949 to 1989 was famous as the Bridge of Spies as it was used for exchanging captured agents between the Soviet bloc and the free West.

A video installation by Stefan Roloff is part of the mansion's permanent exhibition.

== See also ==
- The House at the Bridge: A Story of Modern Germany (Scribner, 1995) ISBN 0-684-19400-7
