= Hermann Schroeder =

German composer and Catholic church musician (1904-1984)

Hermann Schroeder (26 March 1904 – 7 October 1984) was a German composer and a Catholic church musician.

== Life ==
Schroeder was born in Bernkastel and spent the greatest part of his life’s work in the Rheinland. His mother's family had common ancestry with Beethoven. He studied from 1926 to 1930 at the Hochschule für Musik Köln, where his most important teachers were Heinrich Lemacher and Walter Braunfels (composition), Hermann Abendroth (conducting), and Hans Bachem (organ).

His main sphere of activity as composer, conductor and organist were supplemental to his work as a professor of choral conducting, counterpoint, and composition. Upon graduation from the conservatory, he obtained a post teaching music theory at the Rheinische Musikschule in Cologne. Eight years later he became organist at the cathedral in Trier. He remained in this post until the end of the war, adding the position of director of the Trier School of Music in 1940. After the war he taught music theory at the Cologne Musikhochschule beginning in 1946, becoming a professor there in 1948 and deputy director in 1958. He was also a reader at Bonn University from 1946 until 1973, and a lecturer at the University of Cologne from 1956 until 1961. He also conducted various semiprofessional ensembles such as the Bach-Verein Köln and the Rheinischer Kammerchor.

His notable students include Karlheinz Stockhausen.

Schroeder died on 7 October 1984 in Bad Orb aged 80.

== Compositions ==
Schroeder's main accomplishments as a composer were in of Catholic church music, where he attempted to break free of the lingering monopoly held by Romantic music. His works are characterized by the employment of medieval elements such as Gregorian chant, modal scales, and fauxbourdon which he combined with quintal and quartal harmonies and 20th-century polyphonic linear, sometimes atonal writing similar to that of Paul Hindemith. His catalog includes much organ music as well as folk-song settings, German settings of the Ordinary and Proper of the Mass, and chamber music (especially with the organ).

== Honours and awards ==
- Robert Schumann Prize of the City of Düsseldorf, 1952
- Arts Prize of the State of Rheinland-Pfalz, 1956.

== Selected works ==
=== Stage ===
- Hero und Leander, opera in six scenes after Des Meeres und der Liebe Wellen by Franz Grillparzer (1944–50)

=== Choral ===
- Missa dorica, op. 15, for choir a capella (1932)
- Missa Gregoriana, for mixed choir, schola, congregation, and organ (1957)

=== Orchestral ===
- Concerto for string orchestra, Op. 25 (1936–37)
- Symphony in D minor, Op. 27 (1940–41)
- Festliche Musik, for string orchestra and piano (1955)
- Concerto for cello and orchestra, Op. 24 (1937)
- Concerto for organ and orchestra, Op. 25 (1938)
- Concerto for oboe and orchestra, Op. 34 (1955)
- Concerto for piano and orchestra, Op. 35 (1955–56)
- Concerto for violin and orchestra (1956)
- Concerto for flute and orchestra, Op. 37 (1958)
- Veni creator Spiritus, hymn for large orchestra, Op. 39 (1961–62)
- Concerto for 2 violins and orchestra, Op. 41 (1965)
- Concertino for piano and winds, Op. 42 (1966)
- Concerto for viola and orchestra, Op. 45 (1970)
- Capriccio a due tempi, for orchestra (1972)
- Concerto for clarinet and orchestra, Op. 47 (1973)
- Concerto for trumpet and orchestra, Op. 53 (1973)
- Concertino for clarinet and string orchestra, Op. 54 (1978)

=== Organ solo ===
- Toccata, Op. 5a (1930)
- Fantasie, Op. 5b (1930)
- Prelude and Fugue on Christ lag in Todesbanden (1930)
- Kleine Präludien und Intermezzi, Op. 9 (1931)
- Sechs Orgelchoräle über altdeutsche geistliche Volkslieder, Op. 11 (1933)
- Die Marianischen Antiphonen (1953)
- Präambeln und Interludien (1953)
- Choral Fantasy on O heiligste Dreifaltigkeit (1955)
- Sonata No. 1 (1956)
- Partita on Veni creator Spiritus (1958)
- Kleine Intraden (1959)
- Pezzi piccoli (1959)
- Orgel-Ordinarium "Cunctipotens genitor Deus" (1962)
- Orgel-Choräle im Kirchenjahr (1963)
- Sonata No. 2 (1963–64)
- Gregorianische Miniaturen (1965)
- Sonata No. 3 (1967)
- Orgel-Mosaiken (1969)
- Zwölf Orgelchoräle für die Weihnachtszeit (1970)
- Motiv-Varianten (1972)
- Septenarium (1973)
- Te Deum Trevirense (1973)
- Proprium pro organo (1974)
- Ordinarium pro organo (1976)
- Concerto piccolo per organo solo (1977)
- Trilogien zu Chorälen (1977)
- Fünf Skizzen (1978)
- Zyklus aus Inventionen (1978)
- Sonatina (1979)
- Choral Toccata Omnium sanctorum (1980)
- Variationen zu einem eigenen Psalmton (1980)
- Beethoven-Variationen, Meditationen Variationen zu einem eigenen zum Dankgesang in der lydischen Tonart aus L. van Beethovens Streichquartett Op. 132 (1980–81)
- Variations on Stille Nacht, heilige Nacht (1982)
- Mixtura à cinque (1983)
- Musik für Orgel (1983)
- Suite concertante (1983)
- Zehn Introduktionen zu Festtags-Introiten (1983)
- Concerto da chiesa (1984)
- Pezzi speciali (1984)

=== Chamber music ===
- String Trio no. 1, for violin, viola, and cello, in E minor, Op. 14, no. 1 (1933)
- Quartet no. 1, for string quartet, in C minor, Op. 26 (1939)
- String Trio no. 2, for 2 violins and viola, Op. 14, no. 2 (1942)
- Duo for violin and piano, op. 28 (1942)
- Quartet no. 2, for string quartet, Op. 32 (1952)
- Piano Trio no. 1, for violin, cello, and piano, op. 33 (1954)
- Sextet for piano and winds, Op. 36 (1957)
- Quartet no. 3, for oboe, violin, viola, and cello, Op. 38 (1959)
- Sonata for solo violin (1960)
- Sonata for oboe and piano (1962)
- Piano Trio no. 2, for violin, horn, and piano, op. 40 (1964)
- Piano Trio no. 3, for clarinet, cello, and piano, op. 43 (1967)
- Quartet no. 4, for string quartet, Op. 44 (1968)
- Sonata for solo flute (1971)
- Sonata for solo oboe (1970)
- Sonata for solo clarinet (1970)
- Sonata for solo bassoon (1970)
- Sonata for solo trumpet (1970)
- Sonata for solo horn (1971)
- Sonata for violin and piano (1971)
- Sonata for solo trombone (1972)
- Sextet for 2 clarinets, 2 horns, and 2 bassoons, Op. 49 (1973)
- Quintet for clarinet and strings, Op. 48 (1974)
- Wind Quintet, Op. 50 (1974)
- Sonata for solo cello (1974)
- Sonata for solo viola (1974)
- Sonata for cello and piano (1974)
- Sonata for solo contrabass (1975)
- String Trio no. 3, for violin, viola, and cello, Op. 52 (1976)
- Duo for violin and viola (1979)
- Quartet no. 5, for string quartet, Op. 55 (1978)
- Sonata for clarinet and piano (1979)

=== Chamber music with organ ===
- Prelude, Canzona, and Rondo, for violin and organ (1938)
- Fünf Stücke, for violin and organ (1953)
- Concertino for violin, oboe, and organ (1966)
- Sonata, for cello and organ (1966)
- Duplum, for harpsichord and organ (1967)
- Duo da chiesa, for violin and organ (1970)
- Drei Dialoge, for oboe and organ, (1972)
- Sonata for trumpet and organ (1974)
- Sonata, for oboe and organ (1977)
- Sonata, for flute and organ (1977)
- Cum organo et tubis, concertino for organ, two trumpets, and three trombones (1975)
- Wachet auf, ruft uns die Stimme, versets for trumpet and organ on the hymn by Philipp Nicolai (1980)
- Impromptu, for trumpet and organ (1982)
- Intrada a due, for 2 trumpets and organ (1982)
