= Anna Krauss =

German clairvoyant and resistance fighter (1884–1943)

- Born: Anna Friese; 27 October 1884; Bogen, German Empire
- Died: 5 August 1943 (aged 58); Plötzensee Prison; Berlin, Nazi Germany
- Cause of death: Decapitation
- Occupations: Resistance member, clairvoyant
- Known for: Member of Rote Kapelle (Red Orchestra resistance group
- Spouse: Josef Krauss (m. 1911)
- Children: 1
- Father: Johann Friese

Anna Krauss (née Friese; 27 October 1884, Bogen (Note: Occasionally an author may give her date of birth as 7 May 1879, but more often it is the latter.) – 5 August 1943, Plötzensee Prison, Berlin) was a German clairvoyant, fortune-teller and businesswomen who became a resistance fighter against the Nazi regime, through her association with a Berlin-based anti-fascist resistance group that was later called the Red Orchestra ("Rote Kapelle") by the Abwehr, during the Nazi regime.

== Life ==
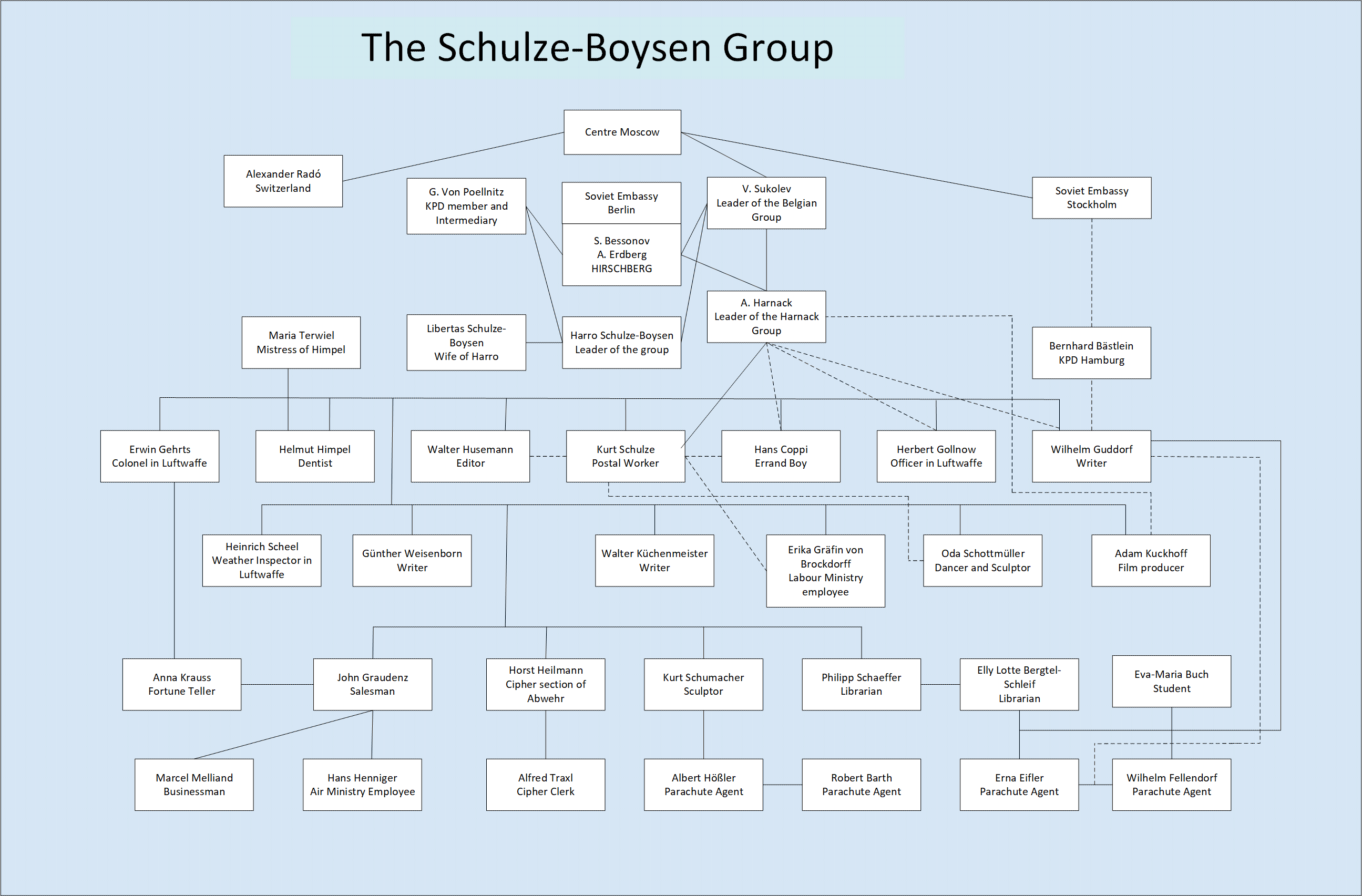
The Schulze-Boysen group in Germany

Krauss was a daughter of a farmer, Johann Friese. In 1911, Krauss married Hungarian Josef Krauss and had a son, Rudolf (born 1914). Josef Krauss was killed in World War I, leaving her a widow. Krauss had a sister, Magda Friese, who lived in an apartment at Parkallee 10, Stahnsdorf. Krauss and her son lived in Berlin from 1920. To earn a living, she became a seamstress to eventually owning a sewing workshop. Since 1936, Krauss, who had undergone commercial training in her youth, became the owner of a paint and varnish wholesaler in Berlin.

== Resistance ==
At the end of 1938, Krauss sheltered a young 22-year-old Jewish woman, Sophie Kuh (her later married name was Sophie Templer-Kuh), who was waiting for a British visa. She had gone to Berlin to visit the British embassy to extend her visa. Sophie Templer-Kuh would die in 2021, aged 104.

In August 1941, Libertas Schulze-Boysen became a client of Krauss after being introduced by Heinrich Karbe, a newspaper journalist. Through Schulze-Boysen, Krauss met Toni Graudenz, wife of John Graudenz, as they both had apartments in Stahnsdorf, being neighbours. Krauss would eventually volunteer the use of her apartment to Graudenz, to host two mimeograph machines to produce anti-Nazi leaflets for the group.

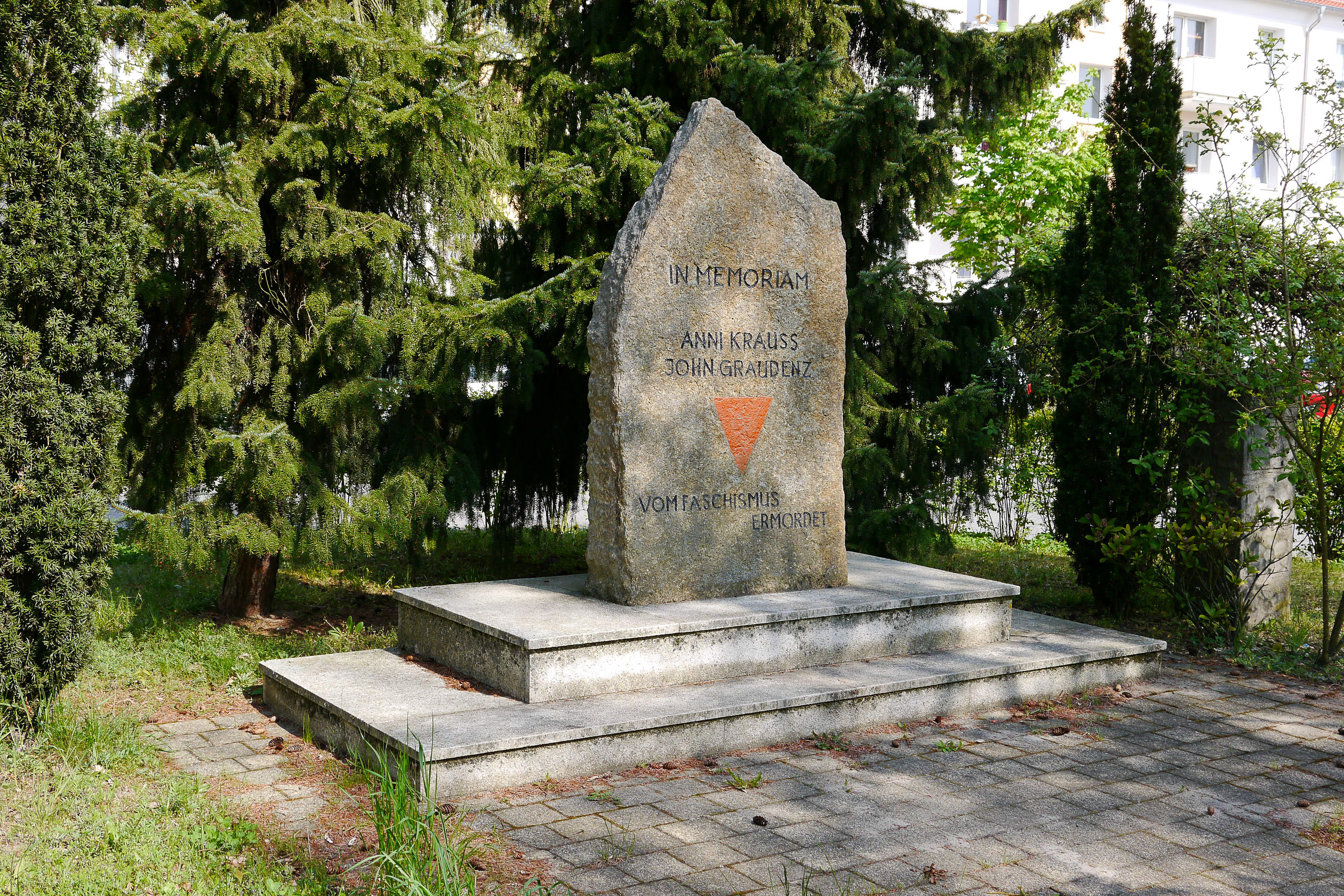
Memorial to Anna Krauss

Many of Krauss's customers were superstitious German officers looking for advice and as they described their upcoming campaigns, she would pass the details along to Schulze-Boyzen via Toni Graudenz who acted in the role of cutout. One of these German officers in that mold was Erwin Gehrts. Gehrts, a colonel in the Luftwaffe, was interested in metaphysics and the occult and led a life that was extraordinary superstitious. He regularly visited Krauss for advice. Krauss read the fortunes of all the members of the resistance group to provide to provide and engender a steely backbone. In a trance like state she would describe the future political future after the Nazis.

Krauss was a full member of the Schulze-Boysen group and was fully informed of all their activities. She would also take part in distributing pamphlets and leaflets. Krauss used her own apartment to host duplicate mimeograph machines that John Graudenz ran to create the leaflets that were known under the name AGIS. Graudenz was responsible for the technical aspect of the production of leaflets and pamphlets that the group produced.

== Arrest ==
Krauss was arrested on 14 September 1942. She was tried by the 2nd Senate of the Reichskriegsgericht ("Military court") and it was announced on 12 February 1943 that she had been sentenced to death for "decomposing the military force". The execution took place on 5 August 1943, as part of a serial execution, during which 17 people, 3 men and 14 women, were guillotined.
