= Richard Rössler =

German pianist

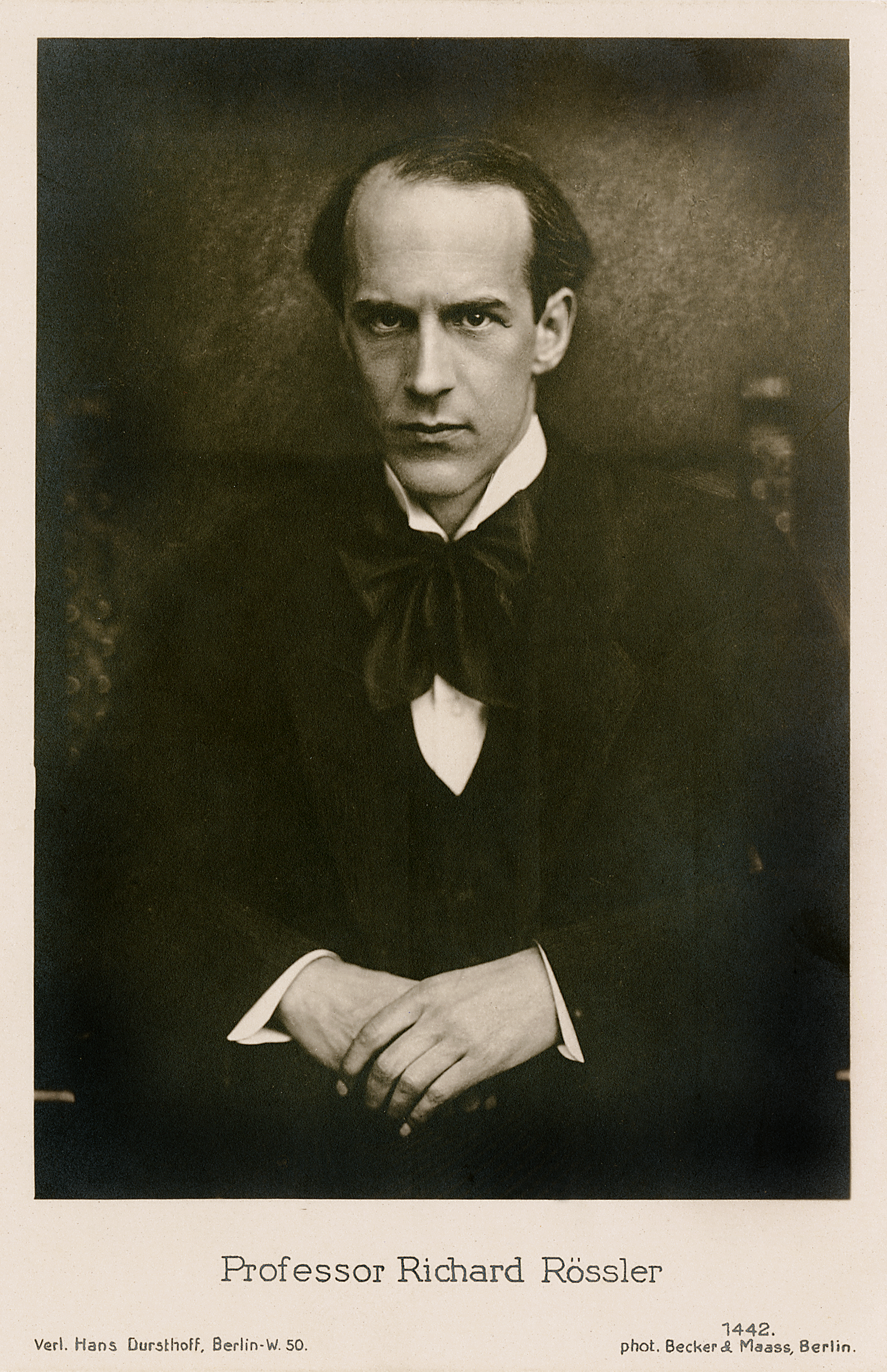

Background information
- Born: 14 November 1880
- Died: 23 June 1962 (aged 81)
- Occupations: musician, composer and music educator
- Instruments: piano and organ

Richard Rössler, also Roessler or Rößler (14 November 1880 – 23 June 1962) was a Baltic German pianist, organist, composer and music educator (academic teacher). In 1910, he married the pianist Dora Charlotte Mayer (1887–1951), a Württemberg pastor's daughter who had studied in Berlin with Ernst von Dohnányi and Max Bruch. The couple had three children.

== Life ==
Born in Riga, Rössler was a son of the Sudeten German Kapellmeister Roman Rössler (1853–1889) from Gablonz and the Baltic German Anna Gertrud née Schweinfurth (1853–1927). The family lived in Poland from 1886 to 1889. After returning to Riga, Rössler attended the local city secondary school until his Abitur in 1897. He received his musical education at the "Schule der Tonkunst" in Riga from 1892, graduating in 1897. (His piano teacher was the Leschetitzky pupil Bror Möllersten.) From 1897 to 1901, he studied composition with Max Bruch (1838–1920) as well as piano with Heinrich Barth (1847–1922) and Ernst Rudorff (1840–1916) at the Universität der Künste Berlin.

In 1900, he received the Mendelssohn Scholarship for composition from the Mendelssohn Society, whose chairman was Joseph Joachim (1831–1907), That same year, he was engaged by Joachim to teach piano at the Hochschule für Musik; in 1904, also as répétiteur and in 1907, as theory teacher. From 1910 to 1953, Rössler was the main subject teacher for piano (from 1918 as professor and later for many years as head of the piano classes). In 1929/30, he was an examiner at the Berggrün Conservatory in Cairo. In 1932, he was the German representative as a juror at the second, and in 1937 (together with Wilhelm Backhaus and Alfred Hoehn) at the third International Chopin Piano Competition in Warsaw.

As a pianist, Rössler was particularly known as a Bach performer. He performed the complete Wohltemperiertes Klavier by J. S. Bach from memory at three piano recitals in the 1930s. In Berlin press reviews of his Bach recitals of 1929 and 1930, he was characterised as a "distinguished, detached personality, stripped of all superfluous externals", and was credited with "exemplary clarity and an incorruptible sense of the measure of expression" as well as "exemplary simplicity and self-evidence, which are the essence of very great art", in addition to "extraordinary skill" and "consummate technique".

In addition to his extensive solo activities covering a wide repertoire, Rössler also performed with renowned contemporary musicians. For example, he performed for decades with the violinist Karl Klingler, with whom he was also on friendly terms and to whom he dedicated several of his compositions. Together with his wife Dora, Rössler formed a piano duo for which he also composed two extensive works (see "Printed Works").

His piano students later included well-known artists such as Andre Asriel, Max Baumann, Erwin Bodky, Ludwig Hoffmann, Irma Hofmeister, Herrmann Hoppe, Jan Koetsier, Ferdinand Leitner, Boris Lysenko, Dr. Hans Joachim Moser, Helmut Roloff, Bertha Tideman-Wijers, Anneliese Schier-Tiessen, Siegfried Schubert-Weber, Ignaz Strasfogel, Volker Wangenheim, Kurt Weill, Gerhard Wilhelm, Ernestine Wolossowa and Ingeborg Wunder.

As a composer, Rössler wrote mainly works for piano (1 and 2 pianos), piano chamber music (duos, trios, 1 quintet, 1 sextet for violin, viola, cello, clarinet, horn and piano), songs and organ works; also 1 string quintet (2 violins, 2 violas, cello), 2 piano concertos, orchestral works (among others, 14 variations and fugue on an original theme for 40 voices; 1 serenade), 4 sacred choruses ("Lamentations of Jeremiah"). He also appeared as an editor (piano works by J. N. Hummel, "Collection Litolff") and arranger ("Perpetuum mobile" by Franz Ries for 2 pianos). Stylistically, he was committed to the music-aesthetic tradition of the Brahms-Joachim circle: "an excellent chamber music composer of the Brahmsian direction." But "there are also musical echoes of Slavic music of the Bohemian as well as the Polish kind".

His compositional work was mainly written until 1920. "Later he composed almost only occasional works for the smaller circle." Since 2012, there are newly recorded: "Trio in A-flat major for piano, violin and violoncello", "Sonata in G major for violin and piano" (op. 20), "Romance in B flat major for violin and piano" (op. 2), "Romance in E flat major for violin and piano" and "Albumblättchen für kleine Tochter, G-Dur".

Rössler died in Berlin in 1962 at the age of 81. His grave is located at the Friedhof Zehlendorf.

== Work ==
- Zwei Lieder (Das alte Lied; Flieder), op. 7 (Berlin 1901, Tessaro-Verlag)
- Trio As-Dur für Clavier, Violine und Violoncello (Berlin 1905, Ries und Erler)
- Sonate E-Dur für Flöte und Klavier, op. 15 (Leipzig/Berlin 1907, Verlag Julius Heinrich Zimmermann)
- Suite d-Moll für Flöte und Klavier, op. 16 (Leipzig/Berlin 1907, Julius Heinrich Zimmermann)
- Passacaglia g-Moll für Orgel (Berlin 1908, Ries und Erler)
- Phantasie d-Moll für Orgel (Leipzig 1908, Verlag Breitkopf und Härtel)
- Fantasie e-Moll für Orgel (Berlin o. J., Ries und Erler)
- Vier Lieder für eine Singstimme mit Clavierbegleitung, op. 18 (Berlin 1908, Ries und Erler)
- Sonate G-Dur für Violine und Klavier, op. 20 (Berlin/New York 1910, Verlage Albert Stahl, G. Schirmer)
- Sonate für zwei Klaviere zu 4 Händen, op. 22 (Berlin/Leipzig 1912, Verlag N. Simrock)
- Vier kleine Klavierstücke, op. 23 (Leipzig/Berlin 1912, Julius Heinrich Zimmermann)
- Walzer für das Pianoforte (G-Dur; Es-Dur), op. 24 (Berlin 1912, Ries und Erler)
- Zwei Impromptus für das Pianoforte, op. 27 (Berlin o. J., Ries und Erler)
- Variationen As-Dur über das Volkslied „Ach, wie ist’s möglich dann“ für zwei Klaviere, op. 29 (Berlin 1920, Ries und Erler)
- Vier geistliche Chöre (Klagelieder Jeremiae) für gemischten Chor, op. 26 (Berlin 1914, Edition Bote und Bock)
- Variationen a-Moll über ein eigenes Thema für das Pianoforte, op. 30 (Berlin 1919, Ries und Erler)
- Sonate A-Dur für Violoncello und Klavier (Berlin 1943, Ries und Erler)
