= Kurd von Schöning =

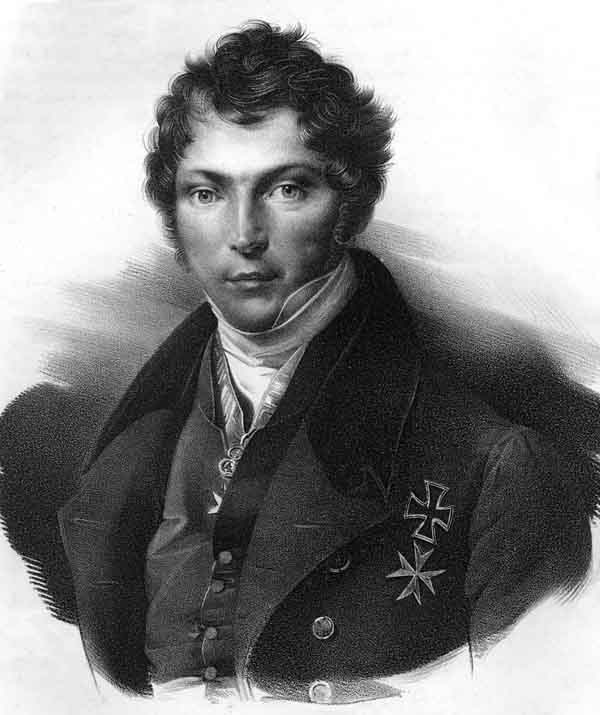
Lithography 1829 after a drawing by Franz Krüger

Kurd Wolfgang Wilhelm Gustav von Schöning (13 August 1789, Morrn (Murzynowo), Landsberg an der Warthe – 2 April 1859, Potsdam) was a Prussian major general and historian of the army.

== Ancestry ==
Kurd came from the Pomeranian noble von Schöning family. He was the son of Christian Stephan von Schöning (born 1752, died 30 October 1802) and Albertine Juliane Therese Tugendreich (d 1844). He was married in 1815 (Gülzow) to Charlotte von Bornstädt (born 25 March 1795, died 25 January 1841).

== Career ==
He was educated in the cadet corps in Berlin and was commissioned in the Prussian Army on 1 April 1806. His uncle was the distinguished General Field Marshal Hans Adam von Schöning. Appointed major in 1821, retired in 1827 as a lieutenant-colonel, Chamberlain of Prince Carl. The Grand Duke of Weimar appointed him Commander of the Order of the White Falcon.

Von Schöning wrote several volumes of Prussian historical notes which served as a primary source for the English work by historian Thomas Carlyle's 'History of Friedrich II of Prussia'. His handwritten papers are located in the Berlin State Library in Berlin.

Villa Schöningen is a historic building in Potsdam at the corner of Berlin Street and Swan Avenue where von Schöning and his family resided until his death in 1859. It was built in 1843 under Friedrich Wilhelm IV by court architect Ludwig Persius in an Italian villa style.

His apparent verbose writings lead Carlyle to comment, "(One) specimen distilled faithfully out of that huge jumbling sea of Schöning and rendered legible."

== Works ==
- Kurd Wolfgang W. G. von Schöning, Der Bayersche Erbfolgekrieg (Berlin, 1854), vol. 4 of Militairische Correspondenz des Königs Friedrich des Grossen mit dem Prinzen Heinrich von Preussen und seinen Generalen aus den Staats-Archiven.
