= Bertha Tideman-Wijers =

Dutch composer

Albertha Wilhelmina Tideman-Wijers (8 January 1887 – 1 January 1976) was a Dutch composer who lived in Indonesia for almost two decades and incorporated Indonesian elements into her compositions. She published her music under the name Bertha Tideman-Wijers.

Wijers was born in Zutphen. Her family moved to Berlin in 1900, where her first music teachers were her mother and Marie Tauszky. She later studied with Max Loewengaard and Wilhelm Klatte at the Stern Conservatory in Berlin, then with Ernst von Dohnanyi and Richard Roessler at the Berlin Hochschule fuer Musik (today the Berlin University of the Arts).

Wijers married Jan Tideman on 31 March 1910 and they had three children, Elisabeth, Bruno and Johanna. Tideman was a government official in the Maluku Islands in Indonesia, and they lived there until returning to the Netherlands in1929. Bruno unfortunately died while fighting in World War II.

Wijers' Small Suite for Carillon won a Visser-Neerlandia prize in 1959. Her papers are archived at the Netherlands Music Institute. Her music was published by Broekmans & van Poppel. Her compositions include:

== Chamber ==
- Adagio en Andante Cantabile in F and D Major (viola and piano)
- Andante Cantabile in A Major (viola and piano)
- Small Suite for Carillon
- Three Compositions for Carillon: Menuet, Interludium, Rondo

== Film Soundtracks ==
- From the Realm of Crystals
- Jan Pieter and His Sister

== Orchestra ==
- Concertino for violin and chamber orchestra No.1
- Concertino for violin and chamber orchestra No.2
- Funeral March

== Piano ==
- Beo's Song
- Berceuse
- Eastern Impressions
- Karo-zang
- Pieces for Piano, opus 5
- Prelude and Fugue
- Seven Elegies
- Toba Fantasy
- Variations

== Vocal ==
- "Child's Talk" (voice and piano)
- Four Dutch Songs, opus 3
- Three Songs on a South African text (soprano and piano; text by Elisabeth Eybers)
- Two cantatas
- Variations on Valerius "Where that one already turns or turns" (violin, cello and piano; text by Catullus)
