= Heinrich Lemacher =

German composer and music educator

Heinrich Lemacher (26 June 1891 – 16 March 1966) was a German composer and music educator.

== Life ==
Born in Solingen, Lemacher studied from 1911 to 1916 at the Cologne Conservatory and at Bonn University, where he received his doctorate in musicology in 1916. From 1925 to 1965 he taught composition, theory and music history at the Hochschule für Musik Köln, where he had been professor since 1928.

Important students of Heinrich Lemacher were Heinrich Weber, Bernd Alois Zimmermann, and his long-time colleague at the Cologne Academy of Music Hermann Schroeder, who was also co-author of his most important teaching works.

Lemacher died at the age of 74 in a Cologne hospital. He was widowed by Maria Augusta Horst, whom he had married in Cologne in 1927.

== Writings ==
- 125 Jahre Gürzenichchor, Köln Chronik d. Jahre 1927-1952 z. 125-jährigen Jubiläum d. Gürzenichchors u.d. Kölner Concertgesellschaft.
- Lehrbuch des Kontrapunktes.
- Musical form. ISBN 3872520091
- Harmonielehre.
- Musikalisches Brauchtum : Festschrift für Heinrich Lemacher.
- Spasso ostinato. Hans Gerig Verlag, Cologne 1964.

== Work ==
=== Ensemble-/Chamber music ===
- Suite für Streicher op. 38/1
- Cellosonate op. 105
- Bläsersextett op. 208, für 3 Trompeten in B, 2 Posaunen u. Tuba
- Eia, Weihnacht: leichte Fantasie über beliebte Weihnachtslieder für Alt-Blockflöte (oder Querflöte), Violine, Violoncello u. Klavier

=== Piano and organ music ===
- Glocken : Legende : Fanfaren; Werk 23
- Geteilte Freud' ist doppelte Freud': Fünffingerstücke für Klavier zu vier Händen; Werk 53, I
- Wölfchens Wochenend: für Klavier zu vier Händen; Werk 53, II
- Wir Kleinen klavieren zu Vieren: für Klavier zu vier Händen; Werk 53, V
- Idyllen: für Klavier zu vier Händen; Werk 101, IV
- Duisdorfer Kirmes: für Klavier zu vier Händen; op. 115
- Viel Freuden mit sich bringet: Variationen für Klavier; Werk 122, I

=== Sacred choral works ===
- Missa Laudate Dominum für zweistimmigen Chor und Orgel (Harmonium); op. 134
- Missa Regina Pacis für vierstimmigen Chor und Orgel; op. 100
- Missa Pastor bonus für dreistimmigen Chor und Orgel; op. 170
- Missa Princeps pacis für dreistimmigen Chor und Orgel, Streich-Orchester ad. lib.; op. 180

== Writings ==
- 125 Jahre Gürzenichchor, Köln Chronik d. Jahre 1927-1952 z. 125-jährigen Jubiläum d. Gürzenichchors u.d. Kölner Concertgesellschaft.
- Lehrbuch des Kontrapunktes.
- Musical form.
- Harmonielehre.
- Musikalisches Brauchtum : Festschrift für Heinrich Lemacher.

== Literature ==
- Karl Gustav Fellerer (1985). "Lemacher, Heinrich". Neue Deutsche Biographie (in German). Vol. 14. Berlin: Duncker & Humblot. pp. 180–181. (full text online).
- J. Dahlberg, Studien zur geistlichen Chormusik Heinrich Lemachers (Kölner Beiträge zur Musikforschung, Band 131), Regensburg 1983 (with complete catalogue of works)
- Karl Laux; “Musik und Musiker der Gegenwart”, 1949. Verlag Dr. W. Spiel K.G., Essen
