= Erwin Gehrts =

German conservative socialist and resistance fighter (1890–1943)

Identity picture of Erwin Gehrts in his Luftwaffe uniform

Erwin Gehrts (18 April 1890 in Hamburg – 10 February 1943 in Plötzensee Prison) was a German conservative socialist, resistance fighter against the Nazi regime, journalist and colonel in the Luftwaffe. Trained as a teacher, Gehrts was conscripted as a flying officer during World War I. During the interwar period, he became a journalist. However, with the emergence of the Nazi states, his newspaper, the Tägliche Rundschau, was banned. Finding work with the Luftwaffe, he became disillusioned with the Nazis. He became associated with a Berlin-based anti-fascist resistance group that was later called the Red Orchestra ("Rote Kapelle") by the Abwehr and an informer to Harro Shulze-Boysen, passing secrets from the air ministry.

== Life ==
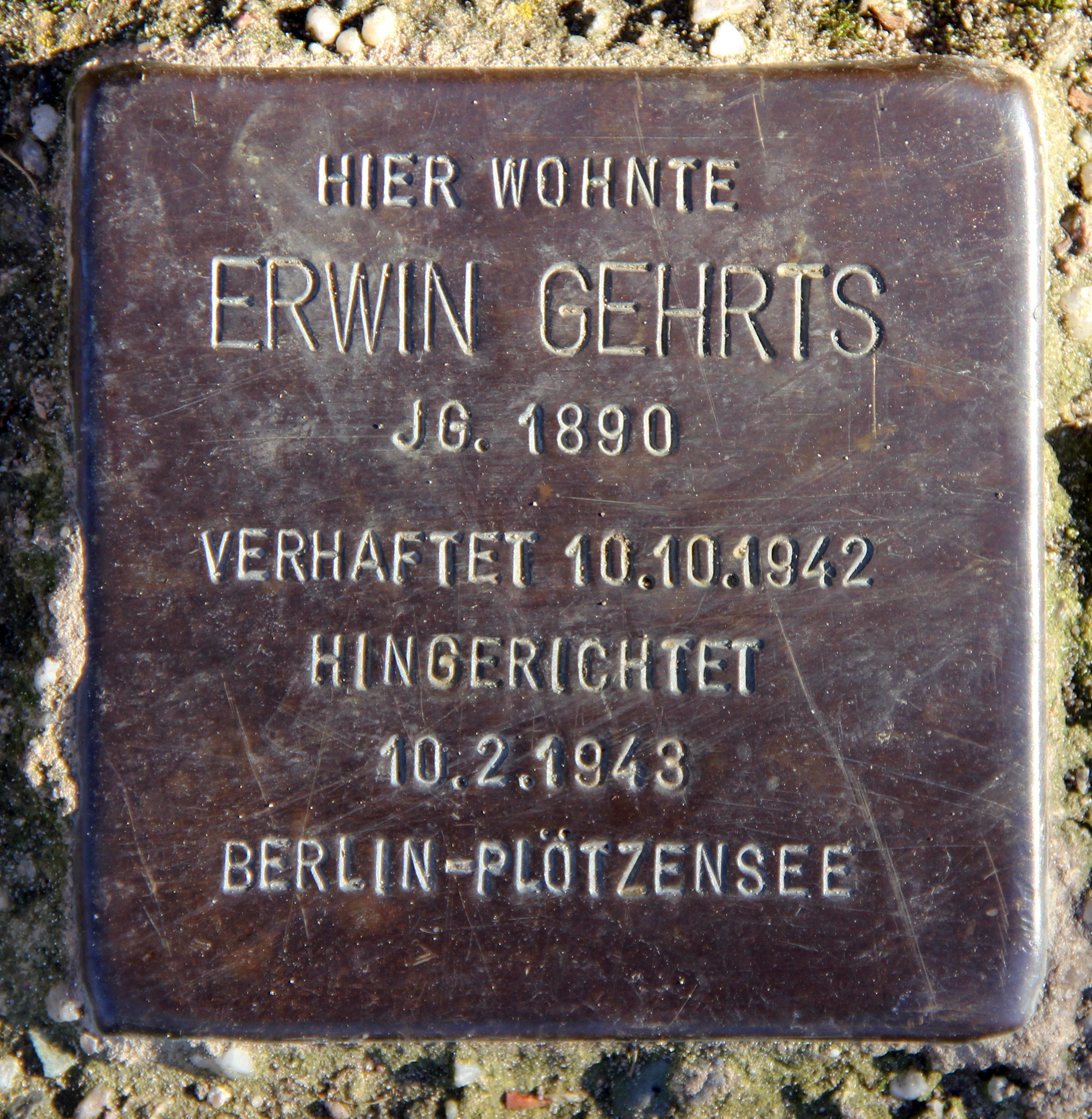
A Stolperstein, a stumbling block of Erwin Gehrts, located at 41a Uhlandstraße, Lichtenrade Berlin

The son of a merchant, Gehrts grew up before the period known as "Wilhelminism". As a youth he became a member of the Wandervogel a bourgeois youth movement, that he remained involved with in his whole life. After he completed his early education in 1913, he decided to study Literature and Natural science at the University of Freiburg.

In 1922, he married Hildegard Gehrts née Kremer, but suffered despair at bereavement, when his young daughter died in July 1924. In 1925, his wife Hildegard died after giving birth to their son, Hans-Erwin on 12 November 1925. In 1927 he remarried but again suffered bereavement when his child died only after 3 months. On 1 October 1930, his daughter Barbara was born.

== Career ==
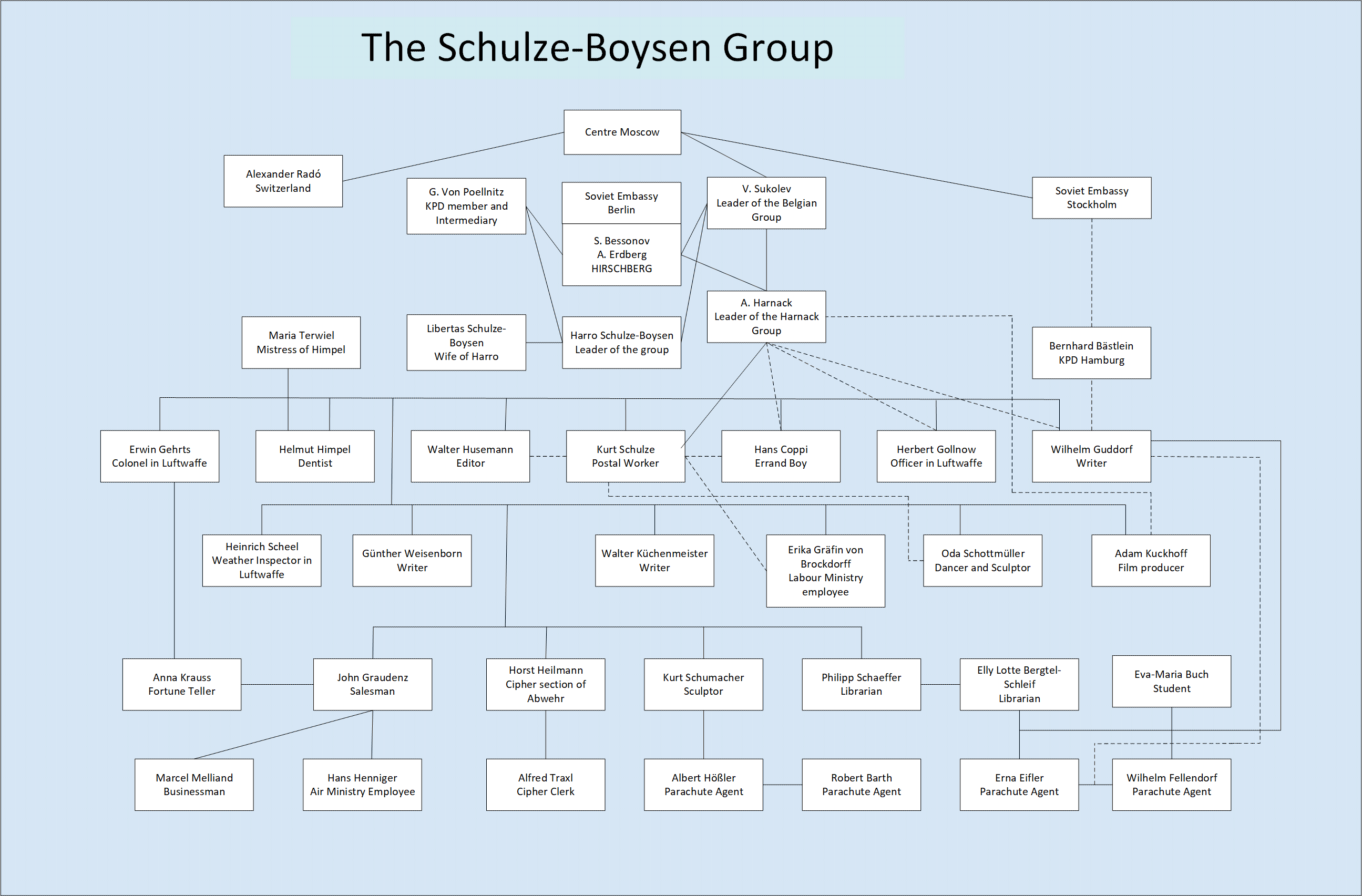
The Schulze-Boysen group in Germany

During World War I Gehrts served as a flying officer achieving the rank of Lieutenant. Gehrts was editor-in-chief until 1932, when he worked as a journalist for the Tägliche Rundschau newspaper in Berlin. When the Nazis came to power, the Tägliche Rundschau was banned and Gehrts became unemployed. In 1935, his former superior officer, now Generalmajor Waldemar Klepe offered Gehrts a position in the Nazi Ministry of Aviation at the rank of captain. He initially worked in the long-range reconnaissance and aerial photography department before later moving to the regulations and teaching materials department. In 1937 Gehrts published "Der Aufklärungsflieger". By 1938 he was adjutant to the General of the Air Force at the Commander in Chief of the Army. After promotion several times, by 1942 he was responsible for the Special Missions branch of the Luftwaffe. This gave him access to a wide variety of top-secret information including advance notice of airborne missions in the east. His primary responsibility was to arrange transport for paratroopers.

As a person, Gehrts was an adherent of the Confessional Movement who considered the invasion of Russia to be criminal lunacy. He was interested in metaphysics and the occult but led a life that was extraordinary superstitious. He regularly visited the fortune teller Anna Krauss for advice, and allowed himself to be swayed by the advice that Krauss's offered. In 1928, Gehrts met Harro Schulze-Boysen while in discussion at the left-liberal magazine Der Gegner or The Opponent. Gehrts had many conversations with Schulze-Boysen over many years while in Communist discussion groups, whose purpose was to prepare Germany anew. In 1941-1942 Gehrts came into direct contact with the resistance group around Schulze-Boysen that would later be called the Red Orchestra by the Abwehr. Gehrts became an informer to Schulze-Boysen, supplying him with all the documents that he received in his capacity as a staff officer on the General Staff of the Luftwaffe. In April 1941, he told Schulze-Boysen of both the time and place of the invasion. He stated that the Russian invasion plan by the Luftwaffe called for a lightning-fast attack in Ukraine followed by an eastern advance and it was likely to be launched in the spring of 1941 Schulze-Boysen incorporated much of this information into his own reports, that were sometimes passed to Arvid Harnack to be written into his own reports, then couriered to Soviet intelligence.

== Arrest ==
Erwin Gehrts was arrested on 9 October 1942 and his trial took place on 10 January 1943 at the Reichskriegsgericht (Military court). In January 1943 he was sentenced to death for "undermining military strength". On 10 February 1943, he was executed in Plötzensee Prison by guillotine. His wife, Erika Gehrts exerted significant effort in her endeavours for a more lenient sentence.

== Bibliography ==
- Gehrts, Erwin (1939). Der Aufklärungsflieger, seine Aufgaben und Leistungen und die Überraschung im künftigen Kriege [The reconnaissance pilot, his tasks and achievements and the surprise in future wars] (in German). Berlin: E.S. Mittler & Soh. OCLC 44104612.
