= Bogen, Germany =

Bogen
- Town
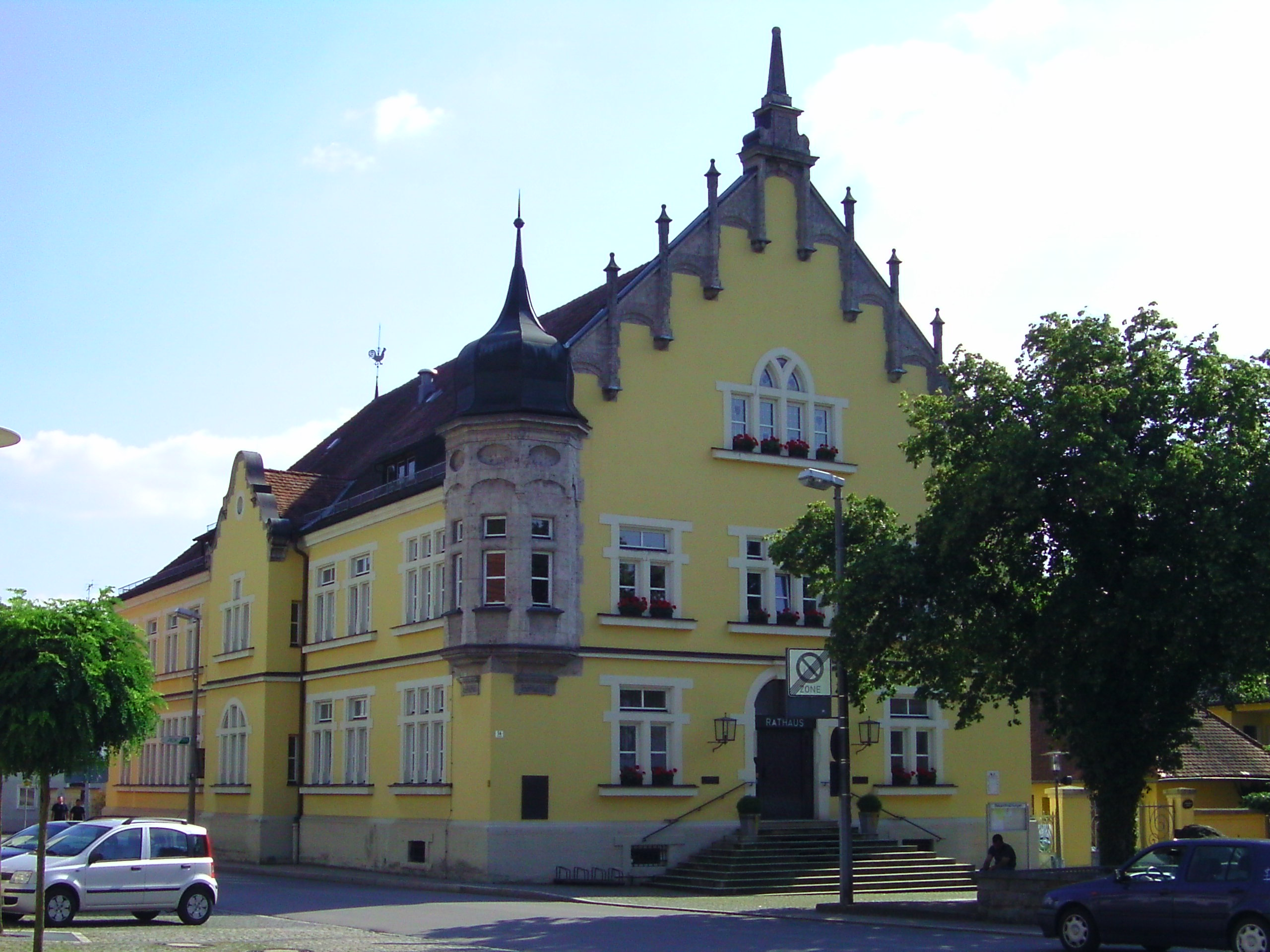
- Town hall

- Coat of arms

- Location of Bogen within Straubing-Bogen district
- Interactive map of Bogen
- Location within Germany Location within Bavaria
- Coordinates: 48°55′N 12°41′E
- Country: Germany
- State: Bavaria
- Admin. region: Niederbayern
- District: Straubing-Bogen

Government
  - Mayor (2020–26): Walter Franz (Voters' Community BOG)

Area
  - Total: 49.74 km^{2} (19.20 sq mi)
- Elevation: 322 m (1,056 ft)

Population (2025-12-31)
  - Total: 10,479
  - Density: 210.7/km^{2} (545.6/sq mi)
- Time zone: UTC+01:00 (CET)
  - Summer (DST): UTC+02:00 (CEST)
- Postal codes: 94327
- Dialling codes: 09422
- Vehicle registration: SR / BOG
- Website: www.bogen.de

Bogen (German pronunciation: [ˈboːɡn̩]; Central Bavarian: Boong) is a town in the district of Straubing-Bogen in Bavaria, Germany. It has a population of 10,105. Bogen is located between the southern slopes of the Bavarian Forest and the River Danube. The town lies at the foot of the Bogenberg, a hill immediately on the Danube. The pilgrimage church of the Assumption of the Virgin Mary (Mariä Himmelfahrt) on the Bogenberg is the destination of one of the oldest pilgrimages for Saint Mary in Bavaria (first mentioned in 1103).

This was also the seat of power of the Counts of Bogen, who died out in 1242, before the fief passed over to the Wittelsbachs. Since 1958, the German Army has been based at the Graf-Aswin-Kaserne military barracks in Bogen. The barracks are home to army engineers and are used for training medics.

== Sport ==
The town's sport club TSV Bogen, whose football division was formed in 1926, experienced its greatest success in 2013 when it won promotion to the Bayernliga for the first time.

== Twinnings ==
- Arco - Trentino - 3 September 1983
- Arthez-de-Béarn (fr) - 4 August 1982
- Schotten - Hesse - 3 June 2001
- Wilhering - Austria - 22 October 2002

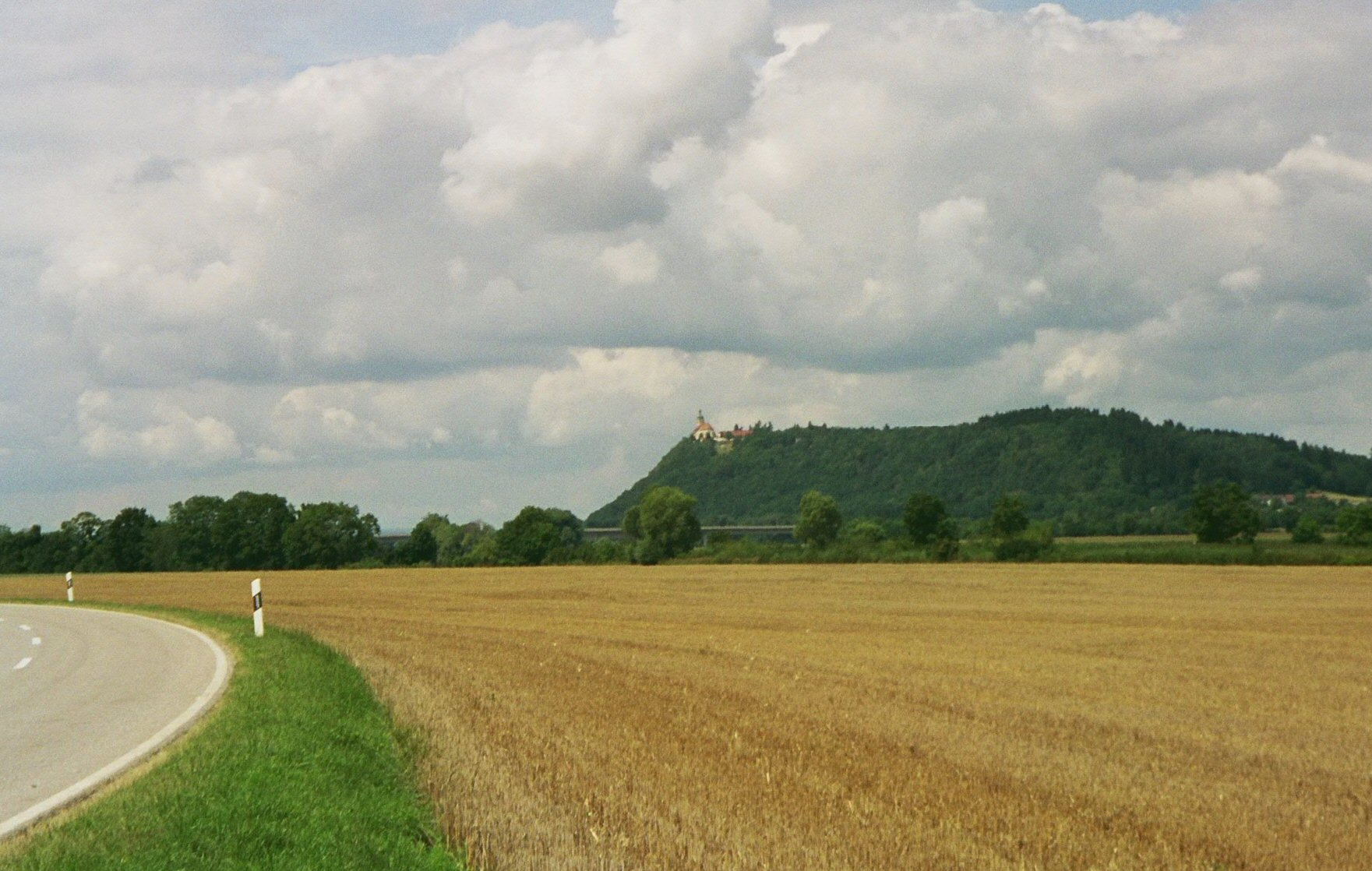
The Bogenberg (Bogen Hill)

== Notable natives ==
- Anna Krauss (1884-1943), German resistance fighter and victim of national socialism
- Max Eberl (born 1973), footballer and football functionary
