= Heinrich Weber (composer) =

German composer and organist

Heinrich Weber (9 October 1901 – 6 January 1970) was a German composer and organist.

== Life ==
Born in Cologne, Weber studied first in Aachen and later at the Musikhochschule Köln. There, among others, his teachers were Hans Bachem (organ) and Heinrich Lemacher (harmony and theory). After some years as cantor at the city church in Mülheim an der Ruhr, he worked as a teacher for organ and theory at different schools of church music, among others more than 25 years at the Katholische Hochschule für Kirchenmusik St. Gregorius in Aachen and last at the Robert Schumann Hochschule Düsseldorf.

Weber, meanwhile appointed Kirchenmusikdirektor of Mülheim, was regarded as an outstanding interpreter, especially of French organ music, and gained an excellent reputation as an improviser. His numerous organ compositions are oriented towards Paul Hindemith, whom he greatly admired, and towards the new French school, and represent a tonal language that clearly emancipates itself from late romanticism.

Weber was a member of the Reichsverband der katholischen Kirchenangestellten e. V. in Essen. Together with this association, Weber organized a study trip to Paris in 1956, where he gave the members the opportunity to meet Marcel Dupré and Rolande Falcinelli and to gain insight into the French organ art. Furthermore, Weber contributed to the organ book for the Roman Catholic Archdiocese of Cologne. His organ compositions were only partially published, however, and are preserved in the musicological institute of the University of Cologne.

Weber died in Aachen at the age of 68.

== Work ==
- Praeludium und Choralfuge f-moll op. 9/1
- Choralvorspiele für Orgel op. 10
- Haec dies - Toccata für Orgel op. 12
- Passacaglia e-moll
- Preaeludium und Doppelfuge fis-moll
- Choral, Variations et Fantaisie über "Es führt drei König Gottes Hand"
- 1. Orgelsonate
- 2. Orgelsonate in D
- 3. Orgelsonate
- Fünf Stücke für Orgel (Verlag Böhm)
- Praeludium, Aria und Fuge über ein eigenes Thema (manuscript)
- Choralvorspiel über "O Maria, Gnadenvolle" (manuscript)
- Choralvorspiel über "Ave Maria Kaiserin" (manuscript)
- Festmesse in D für vierstimmig gemischten Chor und Orgel oder Bläser
