= Stefan Roloff =

Stefan Roloff (born 1953 Berlin) is a German-American painter, video artist, filmmaker, and pioneer of digital video and photography, living and working in New York and Berlin. Roloff's documentary, The Red Orchestra, a portrait of his late father, Helmut Roloff, an anti-Nazi resistance fighter, was nominated for Best Foreign Film 2005 by the US Women Critics Circle. In 2026, he published his first novel (in German), Durchbrenner.

== Life ==
Stefan Roloff was born in West Berlin in 1953 and moved to New York in 1981.

In 1984 the New York Institute of Technology invited Roloff to experiment on prototypes of digital video and imaging computers. He produced "Big Fire", a blend of painting with digital media which was shown in 1986 at the Bronx Museum of the Arts. Also at NYIT, he developed "Moving Painting", a process in which a painting is set in motion by filming each stage that it passes through during its creation. In his film and video projects Roloff collaborated with musicians Suicide, Martin Rev, and Andrew Cyrille, and with Peter Gabriel, with whom he produced FACE, a prototype for his video Sledgehammer, as well as the video ZAAR, for the album Passion. In 1989, for his pioneering digital works, Roloff received a Fellowship from the New York Foundation for the Arts.

He has since produced and directed numerous videos and two documentary films. Each film is accompanied by an art installation, providing a three-dimensional space which the viewers can enter for a direct experience of the subject matter. From 1989 to 1999, he worked on his first documentary film “Seeds”. Traveling through remote areas of West Virginia, he followed the story of a 22- year old woman who committed suicide in 1981 in an isolation cell at the State Prison for Women. The film was combined with an installation, “Pence Springs Resort”, a life-size three-dimensional photographic rendering of the isolation cell which the viewers could physically enter. It was shown at Threadwaxing Space in New York in 1995.

In 1997 he began to work on his second documentary film The Red Orchestra, a portrait of his late father, Helmut Roloff, a resistance fighter against the Nazis. It was nominated for best foreign film 2005 by the US Women Critics Circle. For this film, Stefan Roloff received a 2002 New York City Media Arts grant from the Jerome Foundation. He also wrote a book in German, Die Rote Kapelle, published by Ullstein in 2002. In 2015, through an initiative by Stefan Roloff, Gustin Reichbach and Ellen Meyers, The Red Orchestra was incorporated into the United States Holocaust Memorial Museum's permanent exhibition. Roloff's source interviews with members of the Red Orchestra are accessible on the HMM's database.

In 2017, Roloff had a 229-meter-long installation at the East-Side Gallery in Berlin facing the Spree. It combined in large-format still images from film he had made of the GDR border regime at various of the Berlin Wall in 1984, with silhouetted portraits video of contemporary GDR witnesses. Viewers could access their testimony through smartphone links. Roloff's related video installation "Life in the Death Zone" is permanently installed at Villa Schöningen.

In 2026, the Hamburg publishing house Rowohlt published Roloff's first novel, Durchbrenner. It is promoted as a "gripping, authentic novel about youth caught between a suppressed past and rebellion during the era of the German "economic miracle"—and an escape fueled by beat music, intoxication, and an unquenchable hunger for freedom".

== Selected exhibitions ==
- Bearing Witness, Resistance Memorial Foundation Berlin, Germany (2022)
- Kunst ist Plagiat oder Revolution, Kunsthalle Brennabor, Germany (2020)
- Parallel Worlds, Videoinstallation, 1014 Fifth Av, NY NY (2019)
- Big Fire, audiovisual performance with Andrew Cyrille, Roulette, Brooklyn NY (2019)
- Life in the Death Zone, permanent video installation, Zeitgeschichtliches Forum, Leipzig, Germany (2018)
- Beyond the Wall, Westside Gallery Berlin, Germany (2017)
- Flight, Westwendischer Kunstverein Gartow, Germany (2017)
- The Kindness of Strangers, Summerhall, Edinburgh, UK (2014)
- Lindenhotel, permanente Videoinstallation, Lindenstrasse 54, Potsdam (2013)
- Chairing The Meeting. Kunsthalle Brennabor, Brandenburg an der Havel, Germany (2014)
- Das Leben im Todesstreifen, permanente Videoinstallation, Villa Schöningen, Potsdam, Germany
- XVII Rohkunstbau, Schloss Marquardt (2010)
- Layers, Galerie Deschler, Berlin, Germany (2009)
- Stefan Roloff, Pierogi Leipzig, Leipzig, Germany (2008)
- Prinz Albrecht Str. 8, Altes Rathaus, Potsdam, Germany (2007)
- Eins Plus Eins, SPI Potsdam, Potsdam, Germany (2005)
- Altered States, Kunsthalle Osnabrück, Germany (2004)
- So Into You, Galerie Deschler, Berlin, Germany (2003)
- When 6 Is 9, Deutsch Amerikanisches Institut in Saarbrücken, Tübingen, Nürnberg, Germany (2001/2002)
- When 6 Is 9, Galerie Deschler, Berlin, Germany (1999)
- Pence Springs Resort, Thread Waxing Space, NYC, USA (1995)
- Our Daily Planet, Casa de Cultura Basauri, Bilbao, Spain (1992)
- Stefan Roloff. 1982–1992, The Seed Hall, Tokyo, Japan (1992)
- Niveles, Palau Solleric, Palma de Mallorca, Spain (1991)
- Methamorphosis, Casa de Cultura Laura Alvim, Rio de Janeiro, Brasil (1990)
- Still Life and Methamorphosis, Evan Janis Fine Art, NYC, USA (1990)
- Photomorphosis, Montgomery College, Maryland, USA (1990)
- Moving Painting, Centre Pompidou, Paris, France (1989)
- Paper Murals, Fashion Moda, NYC, USA (1983)
- Gedankengut in Öl und Gummi, Castle Gartow, Gartow, Germany (1982)

== Video Compilations ==
- 2004: Play – Peter Gabriel
- 1992: US – Peter Gabriel
- 1990: Black Box – Suicide

== Selected Catalogues, Publications ==
- Bearing Witness, Resistance Memorial Foundation Berlin, Germany (2022)
- Beyond the Wall, Kunst darf alles e. V. Berlin, Germany (2017)
- Flight, Westwendischer Kunstverein Gartow, Germany (2017)
- Linden Hotel. Potsdam Museum und Fördergemeinschaft Lindenstrasse 54. 2010.
- Stefan Roloff. Videos 1978–2008, Galerie Deschler, Berlin 2008, ISBN 978-3-00-026885-4.
- XVII Rohkunstbau. Berlin 2010, ISBN 978-3-89930-306-3.
- Veränderte Zustände/Altered States. Rasch Verlag, Bramsche 2004, ISBN 3-89946-019-7.
- Rote Kapelle. Die Widerstandsgruppe im Dritten Reich und die Geschichte Helmut Roloffs. Econ Ullstein List Verlag, München 2002, ISBN 3-550-07543-X.
- Die Katakombengesellschaft. Satzweiss.com, 2011, ISBN 978-3-8450-0515-7.
- When 6 Is 9. Galerie Deschler, Berlin 2001.
- Volume Three. Pierogi Press, New York 1999
- Transsexual Exprès. Bilboarte, Bilbao 1998.
- Pence Springs Resort. Thread Waxing Space, New York 1995.
- Nuestro Planeta Cotidiano. Casa de Cultura Basauri, Bilbao 1992.
- Stefan Roloff, Works, 1982-92. The Seed Hall, Tokyo 1992.
- Atlas. Art Gallery of Hamilton, Canada 1990.
- The Photography of Invention. National Museum of American Art, Washington DC 1989.
- Dritte Videonale. Kunstmuseum Bonn, Bonn 1988.
- The Second Emerging Expression Biennial. Bronx Museum, New York 1988.
- Stefan Roloff. Ausstellungen Schinckestraße, Berlin 1987.
- Digital Visions. Everson Museum, Syracuse, New York 1987.
- Zweite Videonale. Kunstmuseum Bonn, Bonn 1986.
- Stefan Roloff. Art Palace, New York 1984.
- Internationales Plastik Symposium. Städtisches Museum Lindau, Lindau 1983.
- Dimensionen des Plastischen. Staatliche Kunsthalle, Berlin 1981.
- Gedankengut in Öl und Gummi. Schloss Gartow, Gartow 1981.

== Grants, Awards ==
- F. F. A. Scrreenwriting Grant (2015)
- MEDIA Grant (2008)
- Massachusetts Foundation for the Humanities Grant (2007)
- B. K. M. Grant, Berlin (2006)
- Jerome Foundation, New York City Media Arts Grant (2002)
- Art Matters Grant (1995)
- Fellowship, New York Foundation for the Arts Grant (1989)
