= John Graudenz =

German writer and resistance fighter (1884–1942)

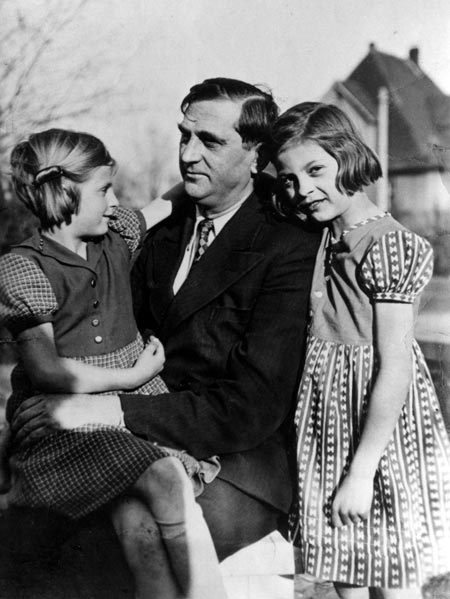
- Graudenz with his daughters, Karin and Silva
- Born: Wolfgang Kreher Johannes Graudenz; 12 November 1884; Danzig, Kingdom of Prussia, German Empire
- Died: 22 December 1942 (aged 58); Plötzensee Prison, Berlin, Nazi Germany
- Cause of death: Execution by hanging
- Known for: Being a core member of the Schulze-Boysen group

Wolfgang Kreher Johannes "John" Graudenz (12 November 1884 – 22 December 1942) was a German journalist, press photographer, industrial representative and resistance fighter against the Nazi regime. Graudenz was most notable for being an important member of the Berlin-based anti-fascist resistance group that would later be named by the Gestapo as the Red Orchestra and was responsible for the technical aspect of the production of leaflets and pamphlets that the group produced.

== Family ==
Born in Danzig, Kingdom of Prussia, Graudenz was the son of a saddler, and came from a large family with 10 siblings.

Graudenz was married three times and also had an illegitimate daughter. In 1925, he married Antonie Wasmuth (died 1985), his third wife. She was the daughter of art publisher Ernst Wasmuth. Together they had two children, Silva and Karin.

== Life ==
In 1901, aged 16 or 17, Graudenz left the family home after a quarrel with the father, to work in various German cities before travelling to England via Italy, France and Switzerland. He worked as a waiter, tourist guide and hotel manager and learned a number of different languages before arriving in Berlin in 1908.

In 1916, Graudenz started journalistic his career as an assistant to the Berlin correspondent of the United Press International and in the same year took over responsibility of the management of the Berlin office of United Press.

In March 1920 Graudenz was involved in resisting the Kapp Putsch that took place in Berlin and was an attempt to overthrow the Weimar Republic. At the time Graudenz worked in the information office of the coup's opponents and became a comrade-in-arms of the opponents of the coup and for a short time was a member of the Communist Workers' Party of Germany (German: Kommunistische Arbeiter-Partei Deutschlands; KAPD). It is even possible that he was a founding member of the KAPD. In 1921 he was posted to the Soviet Union and wrote favourably of Lenin as a journalist for the United Press agency in Moscow. In 1924 he was the first to report the death of Lenin in America.

In 1924, Graudenz organised a Steamboat River cruise along the Volga River along with a group of journalists where they discovered the desolate and famine-stricken state of the Soviet Union. The Russians were angered by the photographs taken while on the cruise and expelled Graudenz.

From 1932, Graudenz worked as an industrial representative. Later during the interwar period and into the war, he worked in a similar position where he sold brake parts for Luftwaffe aircraft.

=== Red Orchestra ===
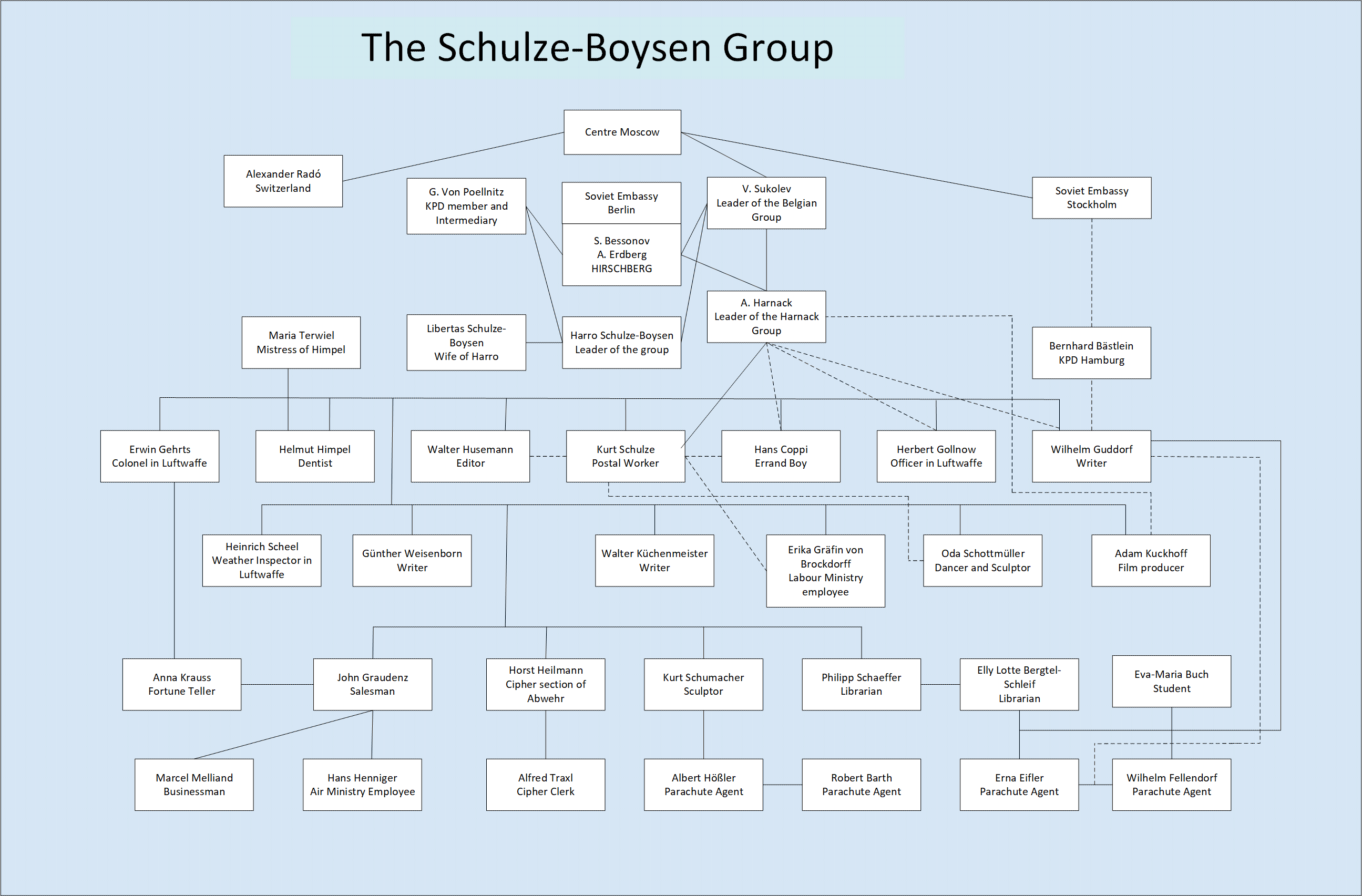
The Schulze-Boysen group in Germany

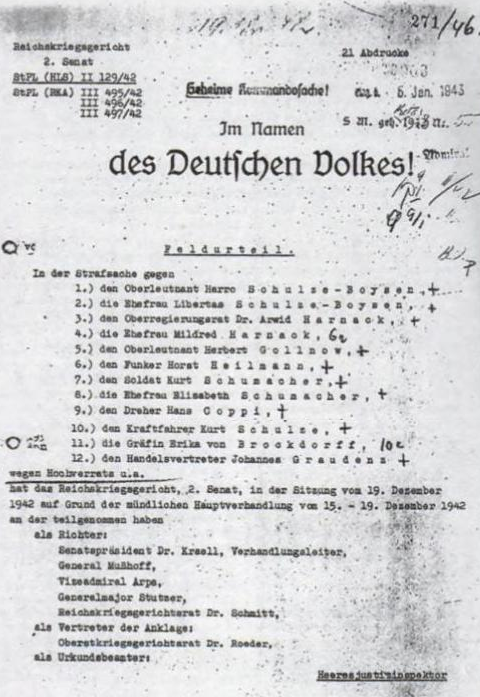
Field judgment of the Reichskriegsgericht of 19 December 1942

In 1938, Graudenz met the Luftwaffe officer and anti-fascist Harro Schulze-Boysen through his neighbour, the supposed fortune-teller and clairvoyant, Anna Krauss who also owned a lacquer and paint wholesaler. Graudenz became one the members of the anti-fascist resistance group of friends that was led by Schulze-Boysen and that would be later be named by the Gestapo as the Red Orchestra. In 1938, Shulze-Boysen's wife, Libertas, became a client of Annie Krauss. Krauss become a core part of the group and used her apartment to host two mimeograph machines that produced leaflets, with Graudenz running the operation.

Graudenz became one of the core members of the group and was considered by Schulze-Boysen as one of his most valuable informants, who had many contacts in the German aviation industry. As well as providing intelligence for the group, Graudenz's skills led to the production of a large number of propaganda leaflets and pamphlets for the group. In February 1942, Graudenz organised the preparation and production of the leaflet called "The people fear for Germany's future" (German: Die Sorge um Deutschlands Zukunft geht durch das Volk).

In the spring of 1942, Schulze-Boysen had discovered that Germany had found and deciphered several British codebooks that enabled them to chart the routes of several Allied convoys between Iceland and Northern Russia and were planning a large attack involving Luftwaffe aircraft, Kriegsmarine U-boats and the battleship Tirpitz. Shulze-Boysen was keen to inform the Allies. It was through Graudenz that Marcel Melliand, a left-wing textile magazine owner and businessman with good contacts in Switzerland became known to Schulze-Boysen. Schulze-Boysen asked Graudenz to establish a link with a contact in Switzerland through Melliand and both Graudenz and Melliand agreed. The Melliand contact was tried in August 1942 when Shulze-Boysen instructed Graudenz to ask Melliand to make the trip. The complete schedule of operations of the convoy was included in the intelligence report. However, the report did not reach England as Melliand was unable to obtain a permit for the trip.

Graudenz continued to produce political, military and economic reports for the resistance group. Graudenz worked for the firm, Blumhardt of Wuppertal that produced aircraft undercarriages and this enabled him to obtain information from a wide group of business and personal contact within the Nazi Ministry of Aviation. His most important report that he obtained through Hans Gerhard Henniger, an air ministry inspector was the Luftwaffe aircraft production figures for June to August 1942.

Adhesive notes of the Red Chapel

In mid-May 1942, Joseph Goebbels held a Nazi propaganda exhibition called The Soviet Paradise (German original title "Das Sowjet-Paradies"), with the express purpose of preparing the German people for the invasion of the Soviet Union.

Graudenz was the initiator the campaign to post adhesive sticker across five Berlin neighbourhoods containing the message:

Permanent Exhibition
The Nazi Paradise
War, Hunger, Lies, Gestapo
How much longer?

== Death ==
John Graudenz was arrested on 12 September 1942 and sentenced to death by the Reichskriegsgericht on 19 December 1942. Without the verdict gaining legal force under the Nazi laws, he was hanged on 22 December 1942 in the Plötzensee Prison on the orders of Adolf Hitler. Even before the beginning of the oral proceedings of Reichskriegsgericht, the Oberkommando der Wehrmacht i.e. the High Command of the Wehrmacht, ordered strangulation, a method of execution without precedent in either Prussian-German civil or military justice.

Due to the German idea that the family shares responsibility for a crime, known as Sippenhaft, both John's daughters and his wife were also arrested on the same day. The 2nd senate of the Reichskriegsgericht sentenced his wife, Antonie Graudenz, on 12 February 1943 for listening to enemy broadcasters and refraining from an advising [the state] to three years in prison. Both Karin and Silva were released after two weeks.

== Memorials ==
- In Stahnsdorf:
  - John Graudenz Street is named after him
  - A memorial stone for Graudenz and Anna Krauss in Anni Krauss Street

== See also ==
- Literature by and about John Graudenz in the German National Library catalogue
- Works by and about John Graudenz in the Deutsche Digitale Bibliothek (German Digital Library)
